This is a list of people associated with the modern Russian Federation, the Soviet Union, Imperial Russia, Russian Tsardom, the Grand Duchy of Moscow, Kievan Rus', and other predecessor states of Russia.

Regardless of ethnicity or emigration, the list includes famous natives of Russia and its predecessor states, as well as people who were born elsewhere but spent most of their active life in Russia. For more information, see the articles Rossiyane, Russians and Demographics of Russia. For specific lists of Russians, see :Category:Lists of Russian people and :Category:Russian people.

Statesmen

Monarchs

Rurik, ruler of Novgorod, progenitor of the Rurikid Dynasty, traditionally the first ruler of Russia
Oleg "the Seer", conqueror of Kiev and founder of Kievan Rus', famous for his wars with Byzantium
Igor "the Old", the first historically well-attested Rurikid ruler
Olga, the first woman ruler of Rus' (regent), the first Christian among Russian rulers
Vladimir I "the Great", turned from pagan to saint and enacted the Christianization of Kievan Rus'
Yaroslav I "the Wise", reigned in the period when Kievan Rus' reached the zenith of its cultural flowering and military power, founder of Yaroslavl
Vladimir II Monomakh, defender of Rus' from Cuman nomads, presided over the end of the Golden Age of Kiev
Yury I "the Long-Handed", founder of Moscow
Andrey I "Bogolyubsky" (the God-Loving), key figure in transition of political power from Kiev to Vladimir-Suzdal

Vsevolod "the Big Nest", the Grand Prince of Vladimir during its Golden Age, had 14 children
Alexander Nevsky, Prince of Novgorod and Grand Prince of Vladimir, military hero famous for the Battle of Neva and the Battle of the Ice, patron saint and the Name of Russia
Ivan I "the Moneybag", brought wealth and power to Moscow by maintaining his loyalty to the Golden Horde and acting as its chief tax collector in Russia
Simeon "the Proud", continued the policies of his father Ivan I, died of the Black Death
Dmitry Donskoy, saint and war hero, the first Prince of Moscow to openly challenge Mongol authority in Russia, famous for the Battle of Kulikovo
Ivan III "the Great", reunited the Central and Northern Rus', put an end to the Mongol yoke, brought Renaissance architecture to Russia
Ivan IV, the first Tsar of Russia, called "the Terrible" in the West; transformed Russia into a multiethnic, multiconfessional, and transcontinental state
Boris Godunov, the first non-Rurikid monarch
False Dmitriy I, the first impostor during the Time of Troubles
Vasili IV Shuisky, Tsar elected during the Time of Troubles
False Dmitry II, the second impostor during the Time of Troubles
Mikhail,  the first Romanov monarch, oversaw the largest ever expansion of Russia's territory, reaching the Pacific

Peter I "the Great", the first Russian Emperor, polymath craftsman and inventor, modernized Russian Army and westernized culture, won the Great Northern War, founded the Russian Navy and the new capital Saint Petersburg
Catherine I, the first Russian Empress
Elizabeth, "the Merry Empress" during the era of high Baroque
Catherine II "the Great", German-born Russian Empress during the Age of Enlightenment, significantly expanded Russia's territory

Alexander I, the first Russian King of Poland and the first Russian Grand Duke of Finland.
Alexander II "the Liberator", enacted the "Great Reforms" in Russian economy and social structure, including the emancipation reform of 1861
Alexander III "the Peacemaker", reversed some of the liberal reforms of his father, Alexander II. This policy is known in Russia as "counter-reforms" , he also opposed any reform that limited his autocratic rule. During his reign, Russia fought no major wars;
Nicholas II, the last actual emperor, forced to abdicate after the February Revolution, killed with his family during the Russian Civil War

Statesmen of the Tsardom and Empire

Aleksey Arakcheyev, Minister of War of Alexander I, organized military-agricultural colonies
Abram Gannibal, general and military engineer of Black African origin, governor of Reval, the great-grandfather of Alexander Pushkin and hero of his novel The Moor of Peter the Great
Vasily Golitsyn, 17th century commander of the Russian Army, Foreign Minister and a favourite of Tsarevna Sophia, abolished rank priority in the military, concluded Eternal Peace Treaty of 1686 with Poland, one of the most educated Russians of the time
Fyodor Golovin, associate of Peter the Great, general admiral, the first Russian field marshal and Chancellor, the first Russian count and the first to receive the Order of St. Andrew, negotiated the Treaty of Nerchinsk and the Treaty of Karlowitz
Alexander Gorchakov, Foreign Minister and Chancellor of Alexander II, a friend and rival of Otto von Bismarck, denounced the Treaty of Paris (1856), advocated the League of the Three Emperors
Ivan Goremykin, twice the Prime Minister of Imperial Russia

Alexander Kerensky, second and the last Prime Minister of the Russian Provisional Government
Franz Lefort, tutor of Peter the Great, general and diplomat, oversaw the foundation of the Russian Navy
Georgy Lvov, first Prime Minister of the Russian Provisional Government
Aleksandr Menshikov, associate and friend of Peter the Great, de facto ruler of Russia for two years after Peter's death, generalissimus, Prince, the first Governor of Saint Petersburg
Pavel Milyukov, founder of the Constitutional Democratic Party, Foreign Minister in the Russian Provisional Government
Nikolay Muravyov-Amursky, governor of the East Siberia, coloniser of the Priamurye and Primorye, concluded the Treaty of Aigun and the Treaty of Beijing (1860) with China
Karl Nesselrode, Foreign Minister of Alexander II and Nicholas I, a leading European conservative statesman of the Holy Alliance
Grigory Orlov, favourite of Catherine the Great who enthroned her, progenitor of Bobrinsky family, founder of the Free Economic Society, owner of the Orlov Diamond
Konstantin Pobedonostsev, tutor to Alexander III and Éminence grise of his imperial politics
Grigory Potyomkin-Tavrichesky, favourite of Catherine II, conqueror and the first governor of Novorossiya, founder of Sevastopol and Yekaterinoslav
Grigori Rasputin, mystic and healer who influenced the latter politics of Nicholas II
Kirill Razumovsky, last Hetman of Ukrainian Cossacks, the president of the Russian Academy of Sciences
Nikolay Rumyantsev, Foreign Minister during the French invasion of Russia, founder of the Rumyantsev Museum
Mikhail Speransky, chief reformer during the reign of Alexander I, father of Russian liberalism, oversaw the publication of the Full Collection of Laws of the Russian Empire
Pyotr Stolypin, Interior Minister and then Prime Minister, put down the Russian Revolution of 1905, initiated Stolypin reform
Ekaterina Vorontsova-Dashkova, closest female friend of Catherine the Great, a major figure of the Russian Enlightenment, a director of the Imperial Academy of Arts and Sciences and the founder of Russian Academy
Sergei Witte, Finance Minister who later became the first Prime Minister of Russia, presided over extensive industrialization of the country, and supervised the construction of the Trans-Siberian Railway
Ivan Serebrennikov, Chairman of the Council of Ministers of the Russian state.
Pyotr Vologodsky, Minister of Supply of the Russian State.

Soviet statesmen 

 Nikolai Bukharin, leading Bolshevik revolutionary, Marxist theoretician, economist and prolific author, Politburo member in the 1920s, editor of government newspapers Pravda and Izvestia, author of The ABC of Communism
 Nikolai Bulganin, leading Communist politician, served as the Minister of Defense and the Premier of the Soviet Union, backed de-Stalinization
 Mikhail Gorbachev last General Secretary of the CPSU and the only President of the Soviet Union, launched the policies of glasnost and perestroika, presided over the dissolution of the Soviet Union
 Mikhail Kalinin, Old Bolshevik politician and the Head of state of the Soviet Union in 1938–1946
 Nikita Khrushchev, leader of the Soviet Union in 1953–1964, launched de-Stalinisation and many erratic policies, backed the progress of the early Soviet space program
 Alexei Kosygin, Soviet Premier under Brezhnev, author of the eventually stifled Kosygin reform which included elements of capitalist management
 Vladimir Lenin, founder of Bolshevik party, the leader of the October Revolution, the first Soviet head of state in 1917–1922, founder of the Soviet Union, creator of Leninism
 Anatoly Lunacharsky, first Soviet Minister of Enlightenment
 Georgy Malenkov, close associate of Stalin, Soviet Premier and one of the leaders after Stalin's death
 Vyacheslav Molotov Soviet Premier in the 1930s, Foreign Minister during World War II, a close associate of Stalin
 Yakov Sverdlov, first de jure head of the Russian SFSR
 Mikhail Suslov, leading ideologist during the Brezhnev era 
 Gennady Yanayev, leader of the August Coup that attempted to depose Gorbachev
 Nikolai Yezhov, Interior Minister and head of the NKVD during the period of the Great Purge, was executed soon after

Contemporary Russian politicians 

 Viktor Chernomyrdin, leading politician and businessman, served as the first Chairman of Gazprom and the Premier of Russia
 Yegor Gaidar, leading politician and economist, served as the Premier of Russia, launched the controversial shock therapy reforms aimed at creating a liberal free market economy in Russia
 Boris Gryzlov, leading politician, parliamentarian and diplomat, served as the Minister of Internal Affairs of Russia and the Chairman of the State Duma, currently serves as the Russian Ambassador to Belarus
 Mikhail Fradkov, leading politician, intelligence official and scholar, served as Premier of Russia and the Director of the Foreign Intelligence Service, currently heads the Russian Institute for Strategic Studies
 Sergei Kiriyenko, leading politician and apparatchik, served as the Premier of Russia and the General Director of Rosatom, currently serves as the First Deputy Chief of Staff of the Presidential Administration of Russia 

 Sergey Lavrov, leading politician and diplomat, served as the Russian Ambassador to the United Nations, currently the Minister of Foreign Affairs of Russia
 Yury Luzhkov, leading politician, served as the Mayor of Moscow, was one of the founders of the ruling United Russia party
 Valentina Matviyenko, leading politician, parliamentarian and diplomat, served as the Russian Ambassador to Malta and Greece as well as the Governor of Saint Petersburg, currently the Chairman of the Federation Council
 Dmitry Medvedev, leading politician and security official, served as the President and the Premier of Russia, currently the Deputy Chairman of the Security Council of Russia
 Sergei Mironov, leading politician and parliamentarian, served as Chairman of the Federation Council, founder and current Chairman of the A Just Russia — For Truth party
 Yevgeny Primakov, leading politician, diplomat, intelligence officer and academician, served as the Director of the Foreign Intelligence Service, the Minister of Foreign Affairs and the Premier of Russia, presided over the start of Russian economic recovery and a significant change in foreign policy
 Vladimir Putin, leading politician and intelligence officer, served as the Director of the Federal Security Service and the Premier of Russia, currently the President of Russia, presided over impressive Russian economic recovery and military build-up, annexed Crimea

Anatoly Sobchak, first post-Soviet mayor of St. Petersburg
Sergei Stepashin, Prime Minister in 1999, currently the head of the Account Chamber of Russia (the state audit agency)
Boris Yeltsin, the first President of Russia from 1991 to 1999
Vladimir Zhirinovsky, founder and the leader of the Liberal Democratic Party of Russia, Vice-chairman of the State Duma
Gennady Zyuganov, head of the Communist Party of the Russian Federation since 1993

Military

Army

 Mikhail Annenkov, conqueror of Central Asia and builder of the strategical Transcaspian Railway

Ivan Bagramyan, Soviet marshal, prominent in the Baltic Offensive and Operation Bagration during World War II
Pyotr Bagration, general and hero of the Napoleonic Wars, mortally wounded in the Battle of Borodino
Roman Bagration, general and brother of Pyotr Bagration, participated in the Napoleonic Wars
Aleksandr Baryatinsky, field marshal, perfected the mountain warfare tactics of the Russian Army, captured Imam Shamil during the Caucasian War
Alexander Bekovich-Cherkassky, leader of the first Russian military expeditions into Central Asia, founder of Krasnovodsk
Vasily Blücher, one of the first five Soviet marshals, prominent in the Russian Civil War and the Northern Expedition in China
Maria Bochkareva, founder of the Women's Battalion of Death during World War I
Aleksei Brusilov, World War I general, led the tactically innovative Brusilov Offensive, destroying the military of Austria-Hungary almost completely
Semyon Budyonny, Civil War commander, statesman, triple Hero of the Soviet Union
Vasily Chapayev, legendary Civil War commander, prototype for Chapaev movie and Chapayev and Void novel, hero of many Russian jokes
Mikhail Chernyayev, general, captured Tashkent during the conquest of Central Asia, the governor of Russian Turkestan
Vasily Chuikov, commander and hero in the Battle of Stalingrad, Soviet marshal, double HSU
Denis Davydov, general, guerilla fighter and soldier-poet of the Napoleonic Wars, invented a genre of hussar poetry noted for its hedonism and bravado
Anton Denikin, Civil War general, one of the leaders of White Movement
Hans Karl von Diebitsch-Zabalkansky, field marshal, took Adrianople during the Russo-Turkish War (1828–1829)
Mikhail Petrovich Dolgorukov (1780–1808), Russian major-general who was killed in the Battle of Virta Bro against the Swedes
Nadezhda Durova, "the Cavalry Maiden", a female hero of the Napoleonic wars
Alexander Gorbatyi-Shuisky, voevoda of Tsar Ivan IV, hero of the Russo-Kazan Wars and the final Siege of Kazan (1552)
Leonid Govorov, World War II Soviet marshal, led Operation Spark (1943) which broke the blockade of Leningrad
Andrei Grechko, World War II Soviet marshal, Soviet Defence Minister under Brezhnev
Ivan Gudovich, field marshal, conquered Khadjibey and Anapa in the Russo-Turkish War (1787–1792), conquered Dagestan in the Russo-Turkish War (1806–1812)
Iosif Gurko, commander and hero of the Russo-Turkish War (1877–1878), won the battles of Shipka Pass, Gorni Dubnik and Plovdiv, liberated the Bulgarian capital Sofia
Mikhail Frunze, revolutionary, a prominent Civil War commander
Konstantin Kaufmann, conqueror of the Khanate of Khiva, the first governor of Russian Turkestan
Ivan Konev, Soviet marshal, led Red Army on the Eastern Front,

Lavr Kornilov, World War I general, notable for Kornilov Affair
Nikolay Krylov, Soviet marshal, commander of the Strategic Rocket Forces under Brezhnev, double HSU
Mikhail Kutuzov, hero of the Russo-Turkish War (1787–1792), defeated Napoleon's Grande Armée during French invasion of Russia in 1812, turning the tide of the Napoleonic Wars
Andrey Kurbsky, associate and then a leading political opponent of Tsar Ivan IV, hero of the Russo-Kazan Wars
Peter Lacy, field marshal, led the Siege of Danzig (1734), commander-in-chief during Russo-Swedish War (1741–1743)
Rodion Malinovsky, Soviet marshal, prominent at the Battle of Stalingrad and the Battle of Budapest, Soviet Defense Minister under Khrushchev
Alexander Matrosov, World War II soldier, self-sacrificed himself to win the battle, Hero of the Soviet Union
Aleksandr Menshikov, associate of Peter the Great, field marshal in the Great Northern War, won the principal Battle of Poltava
Kirill Meretskov, Soviet marshal, led the Petsamo–Kirkenes Offensive which liberated the northern Norway from Nazi occupation, prominent in the Soviet invasion of Manchuria
Mikhail Miloradovich, hero of the Napoleonic Wars, killed in attempt to pacify the Decembrist revolt
Kuzma Minin, national hero, merchant who led Russia's struggle for independence against Poland-Lithuania during the Time of Troubles
Burkhard Christoph von Münnich, field marshal, statesman, founder of the first Cadet Corps in Russia, led the Siege of Danzig (1734), commander-in-chief during Russo-Austrian-Turkish War (1735–1739)
Semyon Andreevich Pugachov, captain in World War one, commanded several fronts across the USSR.
Rodion Oslyabya, monk from Trinity Sergius Lavra, hero of the Battle of Kulikovo
Fabian Gottlieb von Osten-Sacken, conquered the Duchy of Warsaw and governed Paris during the War of the Sixth Coalition
Ivan Panfilov, World War II general, hero of the Battle of Moscow, the commander of Panfilovtsy, HSU
Ivan Paskevich, hero and commander in the Russo-Persian War (1826–1828) and the Russo-Turkish War (1828–1829), crushed the Polish November Uprising and the Hungarian Revolution of 1848
Lyudmila Pavlichenko, World War II Soviet sniper, credited with 309 kills, the most successful female sniper in history
Alexander Peresvet, monk from Trinity Sergius Lavra, hero of the Battle of Kulikovo, fought with the Tatar champion Chelubey in single combat where they killed each other
Grigory Potyomkin-Tavrichesky, conqueror and coloniser of Novorossiya, reformer of the Russian Army, led the Siege of Ochakov (1788) during the Russo-Turkish War (1787–1792)
Dmitry Pozharsky, national hero, prince who led Russia's struggle for independence against Poland-Lithuania during the Time of Troubles
Alexander Prozorovsky, commander-in-chief during the Russo-Turkish War (1806–1812)
Nikolay Raevsky, hero of the Napoleonic Wars and the Battle of Borodino
Anikita Repnin, field marshal in the Great Northern War, conquer and the first governor of Riga
Nicholas Repnin, field marshal and diplomat, hero of the Russo-Turkish wars, key man in the Partitions of Poland, pacified the Germans in the War of the Bavarian Succession
Konstantin Rokossovsky, Soviet and Polish marshal, Defense Minister of Poland, double HSU, oversaw the main Soviet battle operations of the Eastern Front (World War II), commanded the Moscow Victory Parade of 1945
Grigory Romodanovsky, leading Russian general of Tsar Alexey's reign, commander-in-chief during the Russo-Turkish War (1676–1681)
Grand Duke Nicholas Nikolaevich, commander-in-chief of the Russian Army at the start of World War I, then commanded the Caucasus front
Pyotr Rumyantsev-Zadunaysky, hero of the Seven Years' War, won the battles of Larga and Kagula and concluded the Russo-Turkish War of 1768–74 by the Treaty of Küçük Kaynarca, military writer
Pyotr Saltykov, most prominent Russian commander-in-chief during the Seven Years' War,   won the battle of Paltzig and the battle of Kunersdorf, captured Berlin
Igor Sergeyev, only marshal of the Russian Federation, Defense minister in the late 1990s
Roza Shanina, World War II Soviet sniper, 54 confirmed kills
Boris Shaposhnikov, Soviet marshal, chief of the general staff during the start of the German invasion, military theorist and author of The Brain of the Army
Aleksei Shein, first Russian generalissimo, commander-in-chief during Azov campaigns
Boris Sheremetev, field marshal in the Great Northern War, won the battle of Erastfer and the battle of Poltava
Ivan Sidorenko, World War II Soviet sniper, over 500 confirmed kills
Mikhail Skobelev, the "White General", conqueror of Central Asia and hero of the Russo-Turkish War of 1877-78
Sergei Sokolov, Soviet marshal, chief commander during the Soviet–Afghan War
Vasily Sokolovsky, Soviet marshal, prominent in the Battle of Moscow and the Battle of Kursk, military theorist
Alexander Suvorov, greatest Russian general of the 18th century, generalissimo who never lost a battle, won at Kinburn, Ochakov and Focşani during the Russo-Turkish War (1787–1792), crushed Kościuszko Uprising, led an outstanding Italian and Swiss expedition, author of The Science of Victory
Semyon Timoshenko, World War II Soviet marshal, won the Winter War, senior professional officer of the Red Army at the start of the German invasion
Fyodor Tolbukhin, World War II Soviet marshal, liberated Bulgaria and Yugoslavia
Michael Barclay de Tolly, field marshal, led a strategic retreat during the French invasion of Russia, led Russian Army to Paris in the War of the Sixth Coalition
Gennady Troshev, chief general during the Second Chechen War, Hero of Russia
Mikhail Tukhachevsky, Red Army commander during the Russian Civil War, Soviet marshal, military theorist
Dmitriy Ustinov, Soviet marshal, proponent of the Soviet space program, Defence Minister in the late Brezhnev era
Aleksandr Vasilevsky, Soviet marshal, Chief of the Soviet General Staff during most of World War II, led the Soviet invasion of Manchuria, double HSU
Vera Voloshina (1919–1941), heroic partisan in World War II
Mikhail Vorontsov, field marshal, hero of the Napoleonic Wars, captured Varna in the Russo-Persian War (1826–1828), led decisive campaigns of the Caucasian War
Eduard Totleben, general and military engineer, hero of the Siege of Sevastopol (1854–1855)
Kliment Voroshilov, Civil War commander, statesman, double HSU
Mikhail Vorotynsky, defeated the Ottoman and Crimean Khanate army in the Battle of Molodi, eliminating the threat of Ottoman expansion into Russia
Peter Wittgenstein, field marshal, defended St Petersburg in 1812, hero of the War of the Sixth Coalition
Ivan Yakubovsky, Soviet marshal, commander-in-chief of the Warsaw Pact under Brezhnev, double HSU
Aleksey Yermolov, hero of the Napoleonic Wars and the Battle of Borodino, military ruler of the Caucasus at the start of the Caucasian War
Andrey Yeryomenko,  World War II Soviet marshal, prominent in the Battle of Stalingrad
Yunus-bek Yevkurov, paratrooper, commander of Russian peacekeepers during the NATO bombing of Yugoslavia, Head of Ingushetia, Hero of Russia
Vasily Zaytsev, Soviet sniper, killed 412 enemy soldiers and officers, including 6 snipers, a hero of the Battle of Stalingrad
Georgy Zhukov, Soviet marshal, chief of the General Staff and representative of STAVKA, four times the Hero of the Soviet Union, oversaw all the main Soviet battle operations of the Eastern Front (World War II), inspected the Moscow Victory Parade of 1945

Navy

Fyodor Apraksin, general admiral, won the Battle of Gangut during the Great Northern War, led the Russian Navy in the Russo-Persian War (1722–1723)
Aksel Berg, admiral and scientist, major developer of radiolocation and cybernetics
Vasily Chichagov, admiral, polar explorer,  won the battles of Öland, Reval  and Vyborg Bay, effectively bringing the Russo-Swedish War of 1788-90 to an end
Cornelius Cruys, vice-admiral, the first commander of the Russian Baltic Fleet
Fyodor Dubasov, admiral, placed Dalny and Port Arthur under Russian control
Sergey Gorshkov, admiral, led major landing operations during WII, commander-in-chief of the Soviet Navy during most of the Cold War
Samuel Greig, admiral, won the Battle of Chesma during the Russo-Turkish War (1768–1774) and the Battle of Hogland during the Russo-Swedish War (1788–1790)
Ivan Grigorovich, admiral, chief of Port Arthur's port during the Siege of Port Arthur
Ivan Isakov, admiral, held the rank Admiral of the Fleet of the Soviet Union, served during World War II
Vladimir Istomin, rear-admiral, hero of the Siege of Sevastopol (1854–1855) during the Crimean War, died in action
Aleksandr Kolchak, admiral, polar explorer, a leader of the White movement during the Russian Civil War
Vladimir Kornilov, vice-admiral, hero of the Siege of Sevastopol (1854–1855), died in the Battle of Malakoff
Nikolay Krabbe, admiral and naval minister, co-founded the first Russian naval bases in Primorsky Krai, oversaw the development of naval artillery and ironclad ships
Nikolay Kuznetsov, admiral, World War II commander-in-chief of the Soviet Navy
Mikhail Lazarev, admiral, three times circumnavigator and discoverer of Antarctica, destroyed five enemy warships as a commander of Azov in the Battle of Navarino, tutor to Nakhimov, Kornilov and Istomin
Stepan Makarov, vice-admiral, inventor and explorer, performed the first ever successful torpedo attack (during the Russo-Turkish War of 1877–1878), built the first torpedo boat tender and the first polar icebreaker, author of the insubmersibility theory, killed in the Russo-Japanese War when his ship struck a naval mine
Pavel Nakhimov, admiral, circumnavigated the world with Mikhail Lazarev, fought in the Battle of Navarino, annihilated the Ottoman fleet in the Battle of Sinope, commander and hero at the Siege of Sevastopol (1854–1855)
Andrey Popov, admiral, hero of the Crimean War, led a Russian flotilla to support the Union during the American Civil War, designed the first true Russian battleship Pyotr Velikiy
José de Ribas, vice-admiral, founder of Odessa, hero of the Siege of Izmail
Grand Duke Alexei Alexandrovich, general admiral and Naval Minister during the Russo-Japanese War
Grand Duke Konstantin Nikolayevich, general admiral and statesman, oversaw the rapid transition of the Russian Navy to ironclad warships
Alexei Senyavin, re-established the Don Military Flotilla and played a crucial role in Russia's gaining access to the Black Sea
Dmitry Senyavin, admiral, won the battle of the Dardanelles (1807) and the battle of Athos against Ottomans during the Napoleonic Wars
Naum Senyavin, vice-admiral, won the Battle of Osel during the Great Northern War
Grigory Spiridov, admiral, destroyed the Ottoman fleet in the Battle of Chesma during the Russo-Turkish War (1768–1774)
Jean de Traversay, admiral, commanded the Russian Black Sea Fleet and Russian Baltic Fleet, organised early Russian circumnavigations
Vladimir Tributs, admiral, a leading navy commander during the Siege of Leningrad, led the Soviet evacuation of Tallinn
Fyodor Ushakov, the most illustrious Russian admiral of the 18th century, saint, won the battles of Fidonisi, Kerch Strait, Tendra and Cape Kaliakra during the Russo-Turkish War (1787–1792), single-handedly carved out the Greek Septinsular Republic, did not lose a single ship in 43 battles
Ivan Yumashev, admiral, reclaimed Southern Sakhalin and Kuril Islands for the USSR during the Soviet–Japanese War, commander-in-chief of the Soviet Navy in the late 1940s
Vasily Zavoyko, fought in the Battle of Navarino, twice circumnavigated the globe, explored the estuary of the Amur River, repelled the superior British-French forces in the Siege of Petropavlovsk during the Crimean War
Matija Zmajević, vice-admiral, hero of the battle of Gangut and the battle of Grengam during the Great Northern War

Air Force

Yekaterina Budanova, World War II pilot, one of the world's two female fighter aces
Valery Chkalov, leader of the first ultralong flight from Moscow to the Russian Far East, leader of the first transcontinental flight by airplane over the North Pole, Hero of the Soviet Union
Mikhail Devyatayev, fighter pilot known for his incredible escape aboard a stolen bomber from a Nazi concentration camp on the Baltic island of Usedom, Hero of the Soviet Union
Nikolai Gastello, first Soviet pilot to direct his burning aircraft on a ground target, HSU
Alexander Golovanov, chief marshal of Aviation at the end of World War II, commander of Long Range Aviation
Sergey Gritsevets, fighter ace during the Spanish Civil War and the Battle of Khalkhin Gol, the first to become twice the Hero of the Soviet Union
Valentina Grizodubova, one of the first Soviet female pilots and Heroes of the Soviet Union, set a record for woman's ultralong flights
Mikhail Gromov, set a record during the transcontinental flight over the North Pole, founded the Gromov Flight Research Institute, HSU
Vladimir Ilyushin, test pilot for OKB Sukhoi, HSU
Nikolai Kamanin, polar aviator, among the first to receive the title Hero of the Soviet Union, trained the first ever cosmonauts, including Yuri Gagarin, Gherman Titov and Alexei Leonov
Alexander Kazakov, most successful Russian flying ace of World War I, the first to perform an aerial ramming and survive
Sergei Khudyakov, Marshal of Aviation during World War II, Chief of Staff of the Soviet Air Force
Vladimir Kokkinaki, famous Soviet test pilot, set twenty-two world records, a president of the Fédération Aéronautique Internationale, double HSU
Zinaïda Kokorina, pilot and flight instructor, in 1925 became the world's first military pilot
Ivan Kozhedub, top fighter ace in the aviation of the Allies of World War II, credited with 62 individual victories, thrice the Hero of the Soviet Union
Pavel Kutakhov, World War II fighter ace, chief marshal of Aviation under Leonid Brezhnev, double HSU
Sigizmund Levanevsky, polar aviator, among the first to receive the title Hero of the Soviet Union, died in a transpolar flight attempt
Anatoly Liapidevsky, polar aviator, the very first person to receive the title Hero of the Soviet Union, general major of Aviation
Lydia Litvyak, World War II pilot, one of the world's two female fighter aces, HSU
Alexey Maresyev, World War II fighter ace, HSU, the prototype for The Story of a Real Man
Ivan Nagurski, first polar aviator, World War I flying ace
Pyotr Nesterov, inventor and pioneer of aerobatics, the first pilot to perform the aerobatic loop, died in the world's first aerial ramming during World War I
Alexander Novikov, chief marshal of Aviation during World War II, double HSU
Yevgeny Pepelyaev, top Soviet fighter ace in the Korean War, HSU
Viktor Pokrovsky, World War I flying ace, the first Russian pilot to capture an enemy plane and pilot
Alexander Pokryshkin, World War II fighter ace, credited with 59 individual victories, triple Hero of the Soviet Union, Marshal of Aviation
Georgy Prokofiev, balloonist who coordinated military stratospheric balloon program in the 1930s, set world record in altitude on USSR-1
Viktor Pugachyov, test pilot and pioneer of supermaneuverability, the first to show Pugachev's Cobra maneuver of Su-27
Marina Raskova, navigator, founder of the three female air regiments during World War II, HSU
Yevgeniya Rudneva, World War II bomber pilot, one of the Night Witches, HSU
Yevgeniya Shakhovskaya, first woman military pilot
Mark Shevelev, World War II Soviet polar aviation commander, HSU
Lev Shestakov, top Soviet fighter ace during the Spanish Civil War, HSU
Yakov Smushkevich, commanded the Soviet aviation in the Spanish Civil War and the Battle of Khalkhin Gol, double HSU
Nelson Stepanyan, World War II dive bomber pilot, destroyed scores of enemy ships, tanks, cars, planes and guns, double HSU
Nikolay Sutyagin, top Korean War Soviet fighter ace, HSU
Victor Talalikhin, World War II fighter ace, among the first to perform aerial ramming at night, HSU
Andrey Vitruk, World War II fighter ace, major general of Aviation, Hero of the Soviet Union and the Hero of Yugoslavia
Mikhail Vodopianov, polar aviator, among the first to receive the title Hero of the Soviet Union, commanded the first World War II Soviet air raid on Berlin in 1941
Yekaterina Zelenko, World War II pilot, the only woman ever to have performed and died in aerial ramming, HSU

Religious figures

Orthodox leaders

Metropolitan Alexius, saint, ruled Russia during Prince Dmitry Donskoy's minority
Patriarch Alexy I, longest serving Patriarch in the Soviet era
Patriarch Alexy II, first post-Soviet Patriarch, oversaw the period of major church restoration and religious renaissance
Metropolitan Isidore, attempted a reunion with the Roman Catholic Church, which instead led to independence of the Russian Orthodox Church
Patriarch Job, last Metropolitan and the first Patriarch of Moscow and All Russia
Patriarch Kirill, current Patriarch of Moscow and all Russia
Metropolitan Macarius, saint, prominent iconographer
Patriarch Nikon, introduced major church reforms which eventually led to a lasting schism in the Russian Orthodox Church, known as Raskol
Metropolitan Philaret, saint, the principal Russian theologian of the 19th century
Patriarch Philaret, de facto ruler of Russia during the minority of his son, Tsar Mikhail
Patriarch Pimen, oversaw the end of the persecution of Christianity in the Soviet Union and the 1000th anniversary of the Baptism of Rus'
Patriarch Sergius, led the Russian Orthodox Church during World War II, when the earlier Soviet militant atheism was scaled down and the Church was re-legalised
Patriarch Tikhon, first Patriarch of Moscow and All Russia after restoration of the Patriarchate in the early Soviet era

Orthodox saints

Alexander Nevsky, Prince of Novgorod and Vladimir, military hero, patron saint and the Name of Russia
Andrei Rublev, famous icon-painter, author of the Trinity
Anthony of Kiev, co-founder of the Kyiv Pechersk Lavra, the first monastery in Russia
Basil Fool for Christ, yurodivy who gave his name to St. Basil's Cathedral on the Red Square
Boris and Gleb, children of Vladimir the Great, the first saints canonized in Kievan Rus'
Tsarevich Dmitry, son of Ivan IV, mysteriously died or killed, later impersonated by the impostors False Dmitry I and False Dmitry II during the Time of Troubles
Dmitry Donskoy, war hero, the first Prince of Moscow to openly challenge Mongol authority in Russia
Feodor Kuzmich, starets who according to a legend was in fact Alexander I of Russia who faked his death to become a hermit
Ioakim Korsunianin, first bishop of Novgorod the Great and builder of the original wooden Saint Sophia Cathedral in Novgorod
John of Shanghai and San Francisco, a leader of the Russian Orthodox Church Outside of Russia
Kirill of Beloozero, founder of Kirillo-Belozersky Monastery
Maximus the Greek, 16th century humanist scholar
Nicholas II of Russia, last Russian emperor, killed in the Civil War with his family; they were beatified as new-martyrs
Nicholas of Japan, brought the Eastern Orthodoxy to Japan
Olga of Kiev, first Christian among Russian rulers
Savvatiy, founder of Solovetsky Monastery
Sergius of Radonezh, patron saint of Russia, spiritual and monastic reformer, founder of the Trinity Sergius Lavra, blessed Dmitry Donskoy for the Battle of Kulikovo
Vladimir I of Kiev "the Great", Kievan Prince who turned from pagan to saint and enacted the Christianization of Kievan Rus'

Explorers

Siberian explorers
Vladimir Atlasov, explorer and coloniser of Kamchatka
Pyotr Beketov, discoverer of Buryatia, founder of Yakutsk and Chita
Ivan Chersky, geologist and explorer of Siberia, explained the origin of Lake Baikal
Semyon Dezhnyov, discoverer of Kolyma, Chukchi Peninsula, Bering Strait and the east extremity of Eurasia, Cape Dezhnyov
Johann Georg Gmelin, traveled over 34,000 km through Siberia, discovered that the Caspian Sea lies below the ocean level
Kurbat Ivanov, discoverer of Lake Baikal, author of the earliest maps of the Russian Far East and the Bering Strait area
Yerofey Khabarov, second Russian to explore the Amur River, founder of Khabarovsk
Stepan Krasheninnikov, explorer and author of the first detailed description of Kamchatka
Alexander Middendorf, explorer of the Taymyr Peninsula, founder of permafrost science, discoverer of Putorana Plateau
Nicolae Milescu, explorer of Siberia and China, the first to point out Baikal's unfathomable depth
Ivan Moskvitin, first Russian to reach the Pacific Ocean, discoverer of the Sea of Okhotsk
Nikolay Muravyov-Amursky, explorer and coloniser of the Amurland and Primorsky Krai
Gennady Nevelskoy, founder of Nikolayevsk-on-Amur, proved that Sakhalin is an island
Vladimir Obruchev, geologist, explorer of Siberia and Central Asia, wrote the comprehensive Geology of Siberia and two popular science fiction and travel novels, Plutonia and Sannikov Land
Maksim Perfilyev, discoverer of Transbaikalia, founder of Yeniseysk and Bratsk
Fedot Popov, discoverer of Chukotka and the Bering Strait, possible discoverer of Kamchatka
Vassili Poyarkov, discoverer of the Amurland, the first Russian to sail down the Amur River
Demid Pyanda, credited with discovery of the Lena River and Yakutia, made an 8,000 km long journey along the previously unknown Siberian rivers
Semyon Remezov, author of the Remezov Chronicle and the first large format cartographic atlas of Siberia
Nikolay Shkot, explorer of Sakhalin and Primorsky Krai, a founder of Nakhodka and Vladivostok
Alexander Sibiryakov, sponsor of the multiple expeditions in Siberia and the Arctic
Mikhail Stadukhin, discoverer of Kolyma, Chukotka and the northern Okhotsk Sea
Anikey Stroganov, coloniser of Perm Krai and the Urals, established the early trade between Russia and Siberian tribes
Semyon Stroganov, coloniser of the Urals and Siberia, sponsor of Yermak's conquest of the Khanate of Sibir
Vasily Tatishchev, supervisor of the first instrumental mapping of Russia, coloniser of the Urals and Siberia, founder of Perm and Yekaterinburg
Tatyana Ustinova, discoverer of the Valley of Geysers in Kamchatka, the world's second largest geyser concentration
Yermak Timofeyevich, conqueror of Siberia, explorer of West Siberian rivers
Ivan Yevreinov, author of the first instrumental maps of Kamchatka and the Kuril Islands

Explorers of Russian America
Alexander Baranov, explorer and governor of Russian America, founder of Fort Ross in California
Vitus Bering, organiser of the Great Northern Expedition, explorer of the Bering Sea and the Bering Strait, founder of Petropavlovsk-Kamchatsky, discoverer of the southern Alaska, the Aleutian Islands and the Commander Islands
Aleksei Chirikov, discoverer of the Aleutian Islands and the northwestern coast of North America
Ivan Fyodorov, discoverer of Alaska
Mikhail Gvozdev, discoverer of Alaska, author of the first instrumental maps of the Okhotsk Sea and Sakhalin shores
Gerasim Izmailov, author of the first detailed map of the Aleutian Islands, founder of the first permanent Russian settlement in America
Otto von Kotzebue, circumnavigator, discoverer of a number of Pacific islands and Kotzebue Sound on Alaska
Gavriil Pribylov, discoverer of the Pribilof Islands
Nikolai Rezanov, founder of the Russian-American Company, protagonist of the rock opera Juno and Avos
Gavriil Sarychev, explorer of the Sea of Okhotsk and the Aleutian Islands
Grigory Shelikhov, founded the precursor of the Russian-American Company and the first permanent Russian settlements in America
Lavrenty Zagoskin, author of the first detailed description of the inner areas of Alaska

Circumnavigators
Fyodor Konyukhov, adventurer, the first Russian to complete the Three Poles Challenge and Explorers Grand Slam, set a record for the solo yacht circumnavigation of Antarctica
Mikhail Lazarev, discoverer of Antarctica and a number of Pacific islands, triple circumnavigator, war hero
Yuri Lisyansky, leader of the first Russian circumnavigation, discoverer of a number of Pacific islands
Fyodor Litke, oceanographer, explorer of Novaya Zemlya, Bering Sea, Bonin Islands, and the Carolines, double circumnavigator
Konstantin Posyet, participant of the circumnavigation on the frigate Pallas, expert on Japan, explorer of the Possiet Bay, Minister of Ways and Communications of Russia
Yevfimy Putyatin, leader of the circumnavigation on Pallas, diplomat, explorer of the Sea of Japan
Nikolai Rezanov, leader of the first Russian circumnavigation, explorer of the Russian America, protagonist of the rock opera Juno and Avos
Fyodor Tolstoy, "the American", mischief-making participant of the first Russian circumnavigation, celebrity adventurer
Ivan Unkovsky, leader of the circumnavigation on Pallas
Vasily Zavoyko, double circumnavigator, explored the estuary of the Amur River, war hero

Travelers in the tropics
Alexander Bulatovich, military advisor of Menelek II of Ethiopia, explorer of Eastern Africa
Wilhelm Junker, explorer of Eastern and Equatorial Africa
Grigory Langsdorf,  explorer of Alaska and Brazil
Nicholai Miklukho-Maklai, anthropologist who lived and traveled among the natives of Papua New Guinea and Pacific islands, prominent anti-racist
Afanasy Nikitin, one of the first Europeans to travel and to document his visit to India, author of A Journey Beyond the Three Seas
Yuri Senkevich, participant of Thor Heyerdahl's voyages on the Ra, Ra II and Tigris (papyrus and reed boats), anchorman of the Travelers' Club TV show for the record 30 years

Explorers of Central Asia
Alexander Bekovich-Cherkassky, leader of the first Russian military expeditions into Central Asia, founder of Krasnovodsk
Alexey Fedchenko, naturalist and explorer, discovered the Trans-Alay Range in Pamir Mountains
Grigory Grum-Grshimailo, discoverer of Ayding Lake (the second lowest land point on Earth)
Nikolai Korzhenevskiy, explorer of the Pamir, discoverer of the Academy of Sciences Range and Peak Korzhenevskaya
Pyotr Kozlov, explorer of Mongolia, Xinjiang and Tibet, discoverer of the ancient Tangut city of Khara-Khoto
Alexander Nevsky, medieval Russian Prince, saint and national hero, one of the first Europeans to travel into Mongolia (with his brother and father)
Ivan Petlin, first Russian to reach China on an official diplomatic mission, left a popular description of his journey
Grigory Potanin,  explorer of Mongolia, Tibet and China
Nikolai Przhevalsky, traveled over 40,000 km through Central Asia, discovered the only extant species of wild horse
Nicholas Roerich, painter, philosopher, archeologist, writer and public figure, explorer of Mongolia, China and India
Pyotr Semyonov-Tyan-Shansky, explorer of the Tian Shan Mountains, discoverer of the Peak Khan Tengri, for 40 years the head of the Russian Geographical Society
Gombojab Tsybikov, explorer and the first photographer of Tibet

Polar explorers
Pyotr Anjou, explorer of the New Siberian Islands and Arctic coastline
Faddey Bellingshausen, discoverer of Antarctica
Vitus Bering, organiser of the Great Northern Expedition, explorer of the Bering Sea and the Bering Strait
Georgy Brusilov, commander of Svyataya Anna, a prototype for The Two Captains
Semion Chelyuskin, discoverer of the north extrimity of Eurasia, Cape Chelyuskin
Artur Chilingarov, leader of the Arktika 2007 expedition, the first to reach the seabed under the North Pole
Valery Chkalov, led the first transcontinental flight by airplane over the North Pole
Semyon Dezhnyov, discoverer of Kolyma, Chukchi Peninsula, Bering Strait and Cape Dezhnyov
Yakov Gakkel, oceanographer, creator of the first bathymetric map of the Arctic Ocean
Matvei Gedenschtrom, explorer of the New Siberian Islands, discoverer of Siberian polynya
Maria Klenova, a founder of marine geology, made the first complete seabed map of the Barents Sea, one of the first women explorers of Antarctic
Ernst Krenkel, radioman for many polar expeditions, set a world record of long-distance radio communication (between Franz Josef Land and Antarctica)
Dmitry Laptev, explorer of the Laptev Sea shores
Khariton Laptev, explorer of the Laptev Sea shores
Mikhail Lazarev, discoverer of Antarctica, war hero
Fyodor Litke, explorer of Novaya Zemlya, Bering Sea, and Pacific
Stepan Makarov, oceanographer, builder of the first polar icebreaker, war hero
Stepan Malygin, author of the first Russian manual on navigation, leader of the western unit of the Great Northern Expedition
Alexander Middendorf, explorer of Taymyr Peninsula, founder of permafrost science, discoverer of Putorana Plateau and the North Cape sea current
Ivan Nagurski, first polar aviator
Dmitry Ovtsyn, explorer of Taymyr Peninsula, mapped the Gydan Peninsula
Pyotr Pakhtusov, explorer of Novaya Zemlya
Ivan Papanin, head of the first drifting ice station North Pole-1
Fedot Popov, discoverer of Chukotka and the Bering Strait
Vasili Pronchishchev, discovered the Byrranga Mountains and multiple islands off Taymyr Peninsula
Maria Pronchishcheva, first female Arctic explorer
Vladimir Rusanov, explorer of Novaya Zemlya and Svalbard, a prototype for The Two Captains
Anatoly Sagalevich, performed the world's deepest fresh water dive (1637 m in Lake Baikal), explored the remains of RMS Titanic, the first to reach the seabed under the North Pole
Rudolf Samoylovich, founder of the Arctic and Antarctic Research Institute, saver of the Airship Italia crew
Yakov Sannikov, explorer of the New Siberian Islands, originated the legend about the Sannikov Land
Otto Schmidt, leader of the first passage of the Northern Sea Route without wintering, supervised many Arctic expeditions
Georgy Sedov, explorer of Novaya Zemlya and Kolyma River, died in attempt to reach the North Pole, a prototype for The Two Captains
Pyotr Shirshov, member of the North Pole-1 crew, founder of Shirshov Institute of Oceanology, proved that there is life in high latitudes of the Arctic Ocean
Alexander Sibiryakov, sponsor of the multiple expeditions in Siberia and the Arctic, including that of Adolf Erik Nordenskiöld
Mikhail Somov, head of the second Soviet drifting ice station North Pole-2, leader of the 1st Soviet Antarctic Expedition, founder of the first Soviet Antarctic stations Mirny and Vostok
Eduard Toll, explorer of Yakutia and the Arctic, died in search of the legendary Sannikov Land
Yevgeny Tolstikov, head of the North Pole-4, led the 3rd Soviet Antarctic Expedition, discoverer of the Gamburtsev Mountains
Alexey Tryoshnikov, head of the North Pole-3, led the 2nd and the 13th Soviet Antarctic Expeditions
Nikolay Urvantsev, explorer of Severnaya Zemlya, discoverer of nickel in Taimyr and founder of Norilsk
Georgy Ushakov, founder of the first settlement on the Wrangel Island, explorer of Severnaya Zemlya, discoverer of Ushakov Island (the last unknown island outside any archipelago)
Boris Vilkitsky, discoverer of Severnaya Zemlya (the last archipelago on Earth to be explored), led the first voyage from Vladivostok to Arkhangelsk via the Northern Sea Route
Vladimir Vize, scientific leader of many Arctic expeditions, predicted the location of Vize Island through the analysis of the pack ice movement in the Kara Sea
Vladimir Voronin, leader of the first passage of the Northern Sea Route without wintering, captain of SS Chelyuskin
Ferdinand Wrangel, explorer of the East Siberian Sea and Alaska

Cosmonauts

Pavel Belyayev, member of the first two-person space crew
Georgy Beregovoy, oldest human to go into space (by date of birth, 1921)
Valery Bykovsky, performer of the longest solo spaceflight
Konstantin Feoktistov, member of the first three-person space crew
Yuri Gagarin, first ever human to travel into space
Yevgeny Khrunov, participant of the first dual spacewalk and crew transfer between spacecraft
Vladimir Komarov, member of the first three-person space crew, the first human to die during a space mission (landing accident)
Sergei Krikalyov, accumulated most time in space (803 days) during six flights
Alexei Leonov, first to perform a spacewalk, a member of the first two-person space crew, space painter
Musa Manarov, first to spend over a year in orbit
Andrian Nikolayev, participant of the first parallel flight, the first to perform spacecraft-to-spacecraft communications, the first to spend two weeks in space
Valeri Polyakov, performer of the longest continuous spaceflight (437 days)
Pavel Popovich, participant of the first parallel flight, the first to perform spacecraft-to-spacecraft communications
Svetlana Savitskaya, second woman to fly into space, the first to perform a spacewalk
Vitaly Sevastyanov, first to spend two weeks in space
Anatoly Solovyev, person who made most spacewalks and accumulated most time spacewalking (over 82 hours)
Valentina Tereshkova, first woman and civilian in space
Gherman Titov, second human to orbit the Earth, the first who spent a whole day and slept in space, the youngest cosmonaut/astronaut so far
Vladimir Titov, first to spend over a year in orbit
Boris Yegorov, member of the first three-person space crew, the first physician in space
Aleksei Yeliseyev, participant of the first dual spacewalk and crew transfer between spacecraft

Inventors and engineers

Polymath inventors
Genrich Altshuller, inventor of TRIZ ("The Theory of Solving Inventor's Problems")
Ivan Kulibin, mechanic and optician, inventor of searchlight, screw-drive elevator, self-rolling carriage (with flywheel, brake, gear box, and bearing), searchlight optical telegraph, mechanic artificial leg
Mikhail Lomonosov, polymath scientist and artist, inventor of coaxial rotor and the first model helicopter, off-axis reflecting telescope and night vision telescope, co-developed Russian porcelain and re-invented smalt
Andrey Nartov, inventor of mechanic slide rest, rose engine lathe, quick-firing battery, cannon telescopic sight
Peter the Great, monarch and craftsman, inventor of decimal currency, yacht club, sounding line with separating plummet, founder of the Russian Navy
Vladimir Shukhov, polymath engineer, inventor of thermal cracking, thin-shell structure, tensile structure, hyperboloid structure, gridshell and cylindric oil depot, built Shukhov Towers and created modern theory of pipeline transport
Leon Theremin, inventor and spy, created theremin, terpsitone, rhythmicon (the first drum machine) and passive resonant cavity bug, introduced interlace technique

Weaponry makers

Andrey Chokhov, maker of the Tsar Cannon, the world's largest bombard by caliber
Vasily Degtyaryov, designer of Degtyaryov-series firearms, inventor of self-loading carbine
Ivan Fyodorov, 16th century inventor of multibarreled mortar, introduced printing to Russia
Vladimir Fyodorov, inventor of assault rifle (Fedorov Avtomat)
Leonid Gobyato, inventor of modern mortar
Mikhail Kalashnikov,  inventor of AK-47 and AK-74 assault rifles, world's most popular (produced more than all other types of assault rifles combined)
Yuly Khariton, chief designer of the Soviet atomic bomb, co-developer of the Tsar Bomb
Sergei Korolyov, inventor of the first intercontinental ballistic missile (R-7 Semyorka)
Mikhail Koshkin, designer of T-34 medium tank, the best and most produced tank of World War II
Nikolai Lebedenko, designer of the Tsar Tank, the largest armoured vehicle in history
Victor Makeyev, developer of the first intercontinental submarine-launched ballistic missile
Nestor Makhno, anarchist, legendary inventor of tachanka
Alexander Morozov, designer of T-54/55 (the most produced tank in history)
Sergey Mosin, inventor of the Mosin–Nagant rifle, one of the most produced in history
Alexander Nadiradze, inventor of mobile ICBM (RT-21 Temp 2S) and the first reliable mobile ICBM RT-2PM Topol
Andrey Nartov, polymath inventor, designed quick-firing battery and cannon telescopic sight
Sergey Nepobedimy, designed the first supersonic anti-tank guided missile Sturm and other Soviet rocket weaponry
Aleksandr Porokhovschikov, inventor of Vezdekhod (the first prototype continuous track tank, or tankette, and the first continuous track amphibious ATV)
Andrei Sakharov, physicist, inventor of explosively pumped flux compression generator, co-developer of the Tsar Bomb, Nobel Peace Prize winner
Vladimir Simonov, inventor of underwater assault rifle
Fedor Tokarev, designer of TT-33 handgun and SVT-40 self-loading rifle, main Soviet guns of WII
Vladimir Utkin, designer of the railway car-launched ICBM (RT-23 Molodets)
Ivan Vyrodkov, inventor of siege tower

Land transport developers

Fyodor Blinov, inventor of tracked wagon and steam-powered caterpillar tractor
Cherepanovs, Yefim and his son Miron, makers of the first steam locomotive in Russia
Ivan Elmanov, inventor of monorail
Ivan Kulibin, mechanic and optician, inventor of self-rolling carriage (with flywheel, brake, gear box, and bearing)
Yury Lomonosov, designer of the first successful mainline diesel locomotive
Pavel Melnikov, Transport Minister, builder of the first Russian Railways, introduced Russian broad gauge
Fyodor Pirotsky, inventor of railway electrification system and electric tram
Leonty Shamshurenkov, inventor of the first self-propelling carriage (a precursor to quadrocycle and automobile)
Pyotr Shilovsky, inventor of gyrocar

Naval engineers

Rostislav Alexeyev, designer of high-speed Raketa hydrofoils and ekranoplans, including the Caspian Sea Monster
Anatoly Alexandrov, inventor of degaussing, developer of naval nuclear reactors (including one for the first nuclear icebreaker)
Mikhail Britnev, designer of the first metal-hull icebreaker Pilot
Stefan Drzewiecki, inventor of electric-powered and midget submarines, designed the first serial submarine, developed the blade element theory
Boris Jacobi, inventor of electric boat, developer of modern naval mining
Alexei Krylov, inventor of gyroscopic damping of ships, author of the insubmersibility theory
Fyodor Litke, explorer, inventor of recording tide measurer
Stepan Makarov, admiral, war hero, oceanographer, inventor of torpedo boat tender, builder of the first polar icebreaker, author of the insubmersibility theory
Victor Makeyev, developer of the first intercontinental submarine-launched ballistic missile
Ludvig Nobel, designer of the modern oil tanker
Pavel Schilling, inventor of electric naval mine
Igor Spassky, designer of the Sea Launch platform and over 200 nuclear submarines, including the world's largest submarines (Typhoon class)
Vladimir Yourkevitch, designer of SS Normandie, developer of modern ship hull design

Aerospace engineers

Rostislav Alexeyev, designer of high-speed Raketa hydrofoils and ekranoplans, including the Caspian Sea Monster
Oleg Antonov, designer of the An-series aircraft, including A-40 winged tank and An-124 (the largest serial cargo aircraft, later modified to world's largest fixed-wing aircraft An-225)
Georgy Babakin, designer of the first soft lander spacecraft Luna 9
Vladimir Barmin, designer of the first rocket launch complex (Baikonur Cosmodrome)
Robert Bartini, developer of ekranoplans and VTOL amphibious aircraft, physicist, tutor to many other aerospace designers
Alexander Bereznyak, designer of the first fighter rocket-powered aircraft, BI-1
Georgy Beriev, designer of the Be-series amphibious aircraft
Georgy Bothezat, inventor of the quadrotor helicopter, (The Flying Octopus)
Vladimir Chelomey, designer of the first space station Salyut 1, creator of Proton rocket (the most used heavy lift launch system)
Evgeniy Chertovsky, inventor of pressure suit
Nicolas Florine, builder of the first successful tandem rotor helicopter
Valentyn Glushko, inventor of hypergolic propellant and electrically powered spacecraft propulsion, designer of the world's most powerful liquid-fuel rocket engine RD-170
Pyotr Grushin, inventor of anti-ballistic missile
Mikhail Gurevich, designer of the MiG-series fighter aircraft, including world's most produced jet aircraft MiG-15 and most produced supersonic aircraft MiG-21
Sergey Ilyushin, designer of the Il-series fighter aircraft, including Il-2 bomber (the most produced military aircraft in history) 
Aleksei Isaev, designer of the first rocket-powered fighter aircraft, BI-1
Mstislav Keldysh, co-developer of the first satellite (Sputnik) and Keldysh bomber
Kerim Kerimov, the secret figure behind the Soviet space program
Nikolay Kamov, designer of the Ka-series coaxial rotor helicopters
Alexander Kemurdzhian, inventor of space exploration rover (Lunokhod)
Nikolai Kibalchich, pioneer of rocketry, author of an early propulsive device design
Sergei Korolev, the father of the Soviet space program, inventor of the first intercontinental ballistic missile and the first space rocket (R-7 Semyorka), creator of the first satellite (Sputnik), supervisor of the first human spaceflight
Gleb Kotelnikov, inventor of knapsack parachute and drogue parachute
Semyon Lavochkin, designer of the La-series aircraft and the first operational surface-to-air missile S-25 Berkut
Mikhail Lomonosov, polymath, inventor of coaxial rotor and the first helicopter
Gleb Lozino-Lozinskiy, designer of the Buran space shuttle and Spiral project
Arkhip Lyulka, designer of the Lyulka-series aircraft engines, including the first double jet turbofan
Victor Makeyev, developer of the first intercontinental SLBM
Artem Mikoyan, designer of the MiG-series fighter aircraft, including world's most produced jet MiG-15 and most produced supersonic aircraft MiG-21
Mikhail Mil, designer of the Mi-series helicopters, including Mil Mi-8 (the world's most produced helicopter) and Mil Mi-12 (the world's largest helicopter)
Alexander Mozhaysky, author of the first attempt to create heavier-than-air craft in Russia, designed the largest of 19th century airplanes
Alexander Nadiradze, designer of the first mobile ICBM RT-21 Temp 2S and the first reliable mobile ICBM RT-2PM Topol
Nikolai Polikarpov, designer of the Po-series aircraft, including Po-2 Kukuruznik (world's most produced biplane)
Mikhail Pogosyan, designer of Sukhoi aircraft, including Su-47, Su-57 and SSJ 100
Alexander Procofieff de Seversky, inventor of ionocraft and gyroscopically stabilized bombsight
Guy Severin, designer of the first spacewalk supporting system
Igor Sikorsky, inventor of airliner and strategic bomber (Sikorsky Ilya Muromets), father of modern helicopter, founder of the Sikorsky Aircraft
Boris Shavyrin, inventor of air-augmented rocket
Pavel Sukhoi, designer of the Su-series fighter aircraft
Vladimir Syromyatnikov, designer of the Androgynous Peripheral Attach System
Mikhail Tikhonravov, designer of Sputniks, including the first artificial satellite Sputnik 1
Konstantin Tsiolkovsky, principal pioneer of astronautics
Alexei Tupolev, designer of the Tu-series aircraft, including the first supersonic transport Tu-144
Andrei Tupolev, designer of the Tu-series aircraft, including the turboprop long-range airliner Tu-114 and turboprop strategic bomber Tu-95
Vladimir Vakhmistrov, supervisor of Zveno project (the first bomber with parasite aircraft)
Alexander Yakovlev, designer of the Yak-series aircraft, including the first regional jet Yak-40
Friedrich Zander, designer of the first liquid-fuel rocket in the Soviet Union, GIRD-X, pioneer of astronautics
Nikolai Zhukovsky, founder of modern aero- and hydrodynamics, pioneer of aviation

Structural engineers
Nikolai Belelubsky, major bridge designer, invented a number of construction schemes
Agustín de Betancourt, polymath-engineer, urban planner, designed the Moscow Manege and the giant dome of St. Isaac's Cathedral, founded Goznak
Vladimir Barmin, designer of the world's first rocket launch complex (Baikonur Cosmodrome)
Akinfiy Demidov, built the Leaning Tower of Nevyansk (the first structure with rebars and cast iron cupola, as well as the first lightning rod in Europe)
Alexey Dushkin, designer of the first deep column station, Mayakovskaya
Alexander Hrennikoff, founder of the Finite Element Method
Nikolai Nikitin, engineer of the largest Soviet structures: Moscow State University, Luzhniki Stadium, The Motherland Calls and Ostankino Tower (once the world's tallest freestanding structure)
Lavr Proskuryakov, builder of multiple bridges along the Trans-Siberian Railway, inventor and tutor
Vladimir Shukhov, engineer-polymath, inventor of breakthrough industrial designs (hyperboloid structure, thin-shell structure, tensile structure, gridshell), builder of Shukhov Towers and multiple other structures

Electrical engineers

Zhores Alferov, physicist, inventor of heterotransistor, Nobel Prize winner
Nikolay Benardos, inventor of carbon arc welding (the first practical arc welding method)
Mikhail Dolivo-Dobrovolsky, inventor of three-phase electric power
Boris Jacobi, inventor of electroplating, electrotyping, galvanoplastic sculpture and electric boat
Konstantin Khrenov, inventor of underwater welding
Alexander Lodygin, one of the inventors of incandescent light bulb, inventor of electric streetlight and tungsten filament
Oleg Losev, inventor of light-emitting diode and crystadine
Vasily Petrov, inventor of electric arc and arc welding
Fyodor Pirotsky, inventor of railway electrification system and electric tram
Alexander Poniatoff, inventor of videotape recorder
Georg Wilhelm Richmann, inventor of electrometer, died from ball lightning during an experiment
Pavel Schilling, inventor of shielded cable, electric mine and electromagnetic telegraph
Nikolay Slavyanov, inventor of shielded metal arc welding
Aleksandr Stoletov, physicist, inventor of photoelectric cell
Pavel Yablochkov, inventor of Yablochkov candle (the first commercially viable electric lamp), transformer and headlamp

IT developers

Georgy Adelson-Velsky, inventor of AVL tree algorithm, developer of Kaissa (the first World Computer Chess Champion)
Boris Babayan, developer of the Elbrus supercomputers
Sergey Brin, inventor of the Google web search engine
Nikolay Brusentsov, inventor of ternary computer (Setun)
Mikhail Donskoy, leading developer of Kaissa, the first computer chess champion
Victor Glushkov, founder of cybernetics, inventor of the first personal computer MIR
Anatoly Karatsuba, developed the Karatsuba algorithm (the first fast multiplication algorithm)
Yevgeny Kaspersky, developer of Kaspersky anti-virus products
Leonid Khachiyan, developed the Ellipsoid algorithm for linear programming
Semen Korsakov, first to use punched cards for information storage and search
Evgeny Landis, inventor of AVL tree algorithm
Sergey Lebedev, developer of the first Soviet and European electronic computers, MESM and BESM
Vladimir Levenshtein, developed the Levenshtein automaton, Levenshtein coding and Levenshtein distance
Willgodt Theophil Odhner, inventor of the Odhner Arithmometer, the most popular mechanical calculator in the 20th century
Alexey Pajitnov, inventor of Tetris
Eugene Roshal, developer of the FAR file manager, RAR file format, WinRAR file archiver
Valentin Turchin, inventor of Refal programming language, introduced metasystem transition and supercompilation

Optics and photography pioneers
Franz Aepinus, inventor of achromatic microscope
Nikolay Basov, physicist, co-inventor of laser and maser, Nobel Prize winner
Yuri Denisyuk, inventor of 3D holography
Semyon Kirlian, inventor of Kirlian photography
Ivan Kulibin, polymath inventor, introduced candle searchlight and searchlight-based optical telegraph
Sergey Levitsky, inventor of the bellows camera, one of the earliest photography pioneers
Mikhail Lomonosov, polymath scientist and artist, inventor of off-axis reflecting telescope and night vision telescope
Alexander Makarov,  inventor of orbitrap
Dmitry Maksutov, inventor of the Maksutov telescope
Boris Mamyrin, inventor of reflectron
Alexander Prokhorov, physicist, co-inventor of laser and maser, Nobel Prize winner
Sergey Prokudin-Gorsky, pioneer of colour photography, inventor of colour film slides and colour motion pictures, famous for his multiple colour photos of Russian Empire
Yevgeny Zavoisky, inventor of EPR spectroscopy, co-developer of NMR spectroscopy

Communication engineers
Hovannes Adamian, inventor of the first RGB-based mechanical colour TV system
Leonid Kupriyanovich, inventor of man-portable mobile phone and pocket mobile phone
Oleg Losev, inventor of crystadine radio
Constantin Perskyi, inventor of the word "television", TV pioneer
Alexander Popov, inventor of lightning detector, one of the inventors of radio
Boris Rosing, the first to use cathode ray tube in a TV system
Pavel Schilling, inventor of electric telegraph
Leon Theremin, polymath, inventor of interlace
Vladimir Zworykin, "the Father of television", inventor of iconoscope and kinescope

Musical instrument makers
Vasily Andreyev, developed the standard balalaika, revived domra and gusli
Vladimir Baranov-Rossine, inventor of Optophonic Piano
Motorins, Ivan his son Mikhail, makers of the Tsar Bell, the largest bell in the world
Yevgeny Murzin, inventor of the ANS synthesizer
Andrei Sychra, inventor of the Russian guitar
Leon Theremin, inventor of theremin (the first successful electronic musical instrument), terpsitone and rhythmicon (the first drum machine)

Miscellaneous inventors
Vitaly Abalakov, mountaineer, inventor of the camming devices and V-thread
Alexandre Alexeieff, inventor of pinscreen animation
Anatoly Kharlampiev, developer of sambo martial art
Lisitsyns family, producers of the first Russian samovars
Sergey Malyutin, painter, inventor of matryoshka doll
Vera Mukhina, sculptor, inventor of welded sculpture
Lucien Olivier, inventor of Salad Olivier
Ivan Polzunov, inventor of the two-cylinder steam engine

Ida Rosenthal, inventor of modern bra, the standard of cup sizes and nursing bra
Alexander Sablukov, inventor of centrifugal fan
Franz San Galli, inventor of radiator
Yefim Smolin, inventor of table-glass
Viktor Vasnetsov, inventor of budenovka
Ludwik Zamenhof, inventor of Esperanto

Scientists and scholars

Polymaths
Alexander Borodin, chemist and composer, author of the famous opera Prince Igor, discovered Borodin reaction, co-discovered Aldol reaction
Alexander Chizhevsky, interdisciplinary scientist, biophysicist, philosopher and artist, founder of heliobiology and modern air ionification, Russian cosmist
Mikhail Lomonosov, polymath scientist, artist and inventor; founder of the Moscow State University; proposed the law of conservation of matter; disproved the phlogiston theory; invented coaxial rotor and the first helicopter; invented the night vision telescope and off-axis reflecting telescope; discovered the atmosphere of Venus; suggested the organic origin of soil, peat, coal, petroleum and amber; pioneered the research of atmospheric electricity; coined the term physical chemistry; the first to record freezing of mercury; co-developed the Russian porcelain, re-discovered smalt and created a number of mosaics dedicated to Petrine era; author of an early account of Russian history and the first opponent of the Normanist theory; reformed Russian literary language by combining Old Church Slavonic with vernacular tongue in his early grammar; influenced Russian poetry through his odes
Vladimir Obruchev, geologist, paleontologist, geographer and explorer of Siberia and Central Asia, author of the comprehensive Geology of Siberia and two popular science fiction novels, Plutonia and Sannikov Land
Peter Simon Pallas, polymath naturalist, geographer, ethnographer, philologist, explorer of European Russia and Siberia, discoverer of the first pallasite meteorite (Krasnojarsk meteorite) and multiple animals, including the Pallas's cat, Pallas's squirrel, and Pallas's gull
Yakov Perelman, a founder of popular science, author of many popular books, including the Physics Can Be Fun and Mathematics Can Be Fun
Pyotr Semyonov-Tyan-Shansky, geographer, geologist, entomologist, explorer of the Tian Shan Mountains, discoverer of the Peak Khan Tengri, for 40 years the head of the Russian Geographical Society,  statistician, organiser of the first Russian Empire Census
Vasily Tatishchev, statesman, economist, geographer, ethnographer, philologist and historian, supervisor of the first instrumental mapping of Russia, coloniser of the Urals and Siberia, founder of Perm and Yekaterinburg, discovered and published Russkaya Pravda, Sudebnik and the controversial Ioachim Chronicle, wrote the first full-scale account of Russian history, compiled the first encyclopedic dictionary of Russian language
Vladimir Vernadsky, philosopher, geologist, a founder of geochemistry, biogeochemistry and radiogeology, creator of noosphere theory, popularized the term biosphere, major Russian cosmist
Ivan Yefremov, paleontologist, philosopher, sci-fi and historical novelist, founder of taphonomy, author of The Land of Foam, Andromeda: A Space-Age Tale and Thais of Athens

Earth scientists

Karl Baer, naturalist, formulated the geological Baer's law on river erosion
Ivan Chersky, geologist, explorer of Siberia, explained the origin of Lake Baikal, pioneered the geomorphological evolution theory
Alexander Fersman, a founder of geochemistry, discovered copper in Monchegorsk, apatites in Khibiny, sulfur in Central Asia
Boris Golitsyn, inventor of electromagnetic seismograph, the President of International Association of Seismology
Ivan Gubkin, founder of the Gubkin Russian State University of Oil and Gas
Alexander Karpinsky, geologist and mineralogist, the first President of the Soviet Academy of Sciences
Vladimir Köppen, meteorologist, author of the commonly used Köppen climate classification
Stepan Krasheninnikov, geographer, the first Russian naturalist, made the first scientific description of Kamchatka
Pyotr Shirshov, polar explorer, founder of the Shirshov Institute of Oceanology, proved that there is life in high latitudes of the Arctic Ocean
Yuly Shokalsky, first head of the Soviet Geographical Society, coined the term World Ocean
Vladimir Vernadsky, philosopher, geologist, a founder of geochemistry, biogeochemistry and radiogeology, creator of noosphere theory, popularized the term biosphere

Biologists and paleontologists

Johann Friedrich Adam, discovered the Adams mammoth, the first complete woolly mammoth skeleton
Karl Baer, naturalist, founded the Russian Entomological Society, formulated embryological Baer's laws
Nikolai Bernstein, neurophysiologist, coined the term biomechanics
Andrey Bolotov, major 18th century agriculturist, discovered dichogamy, pioneered cross-pollination
Alexander Chizhevsky, founder of heliobiology and modern air ionification
Andrey Famintsyn, plant physiologist, inventor of grow lamp, developer of symbiogenesis theory
Yuri Filipchenko, entomologist, coined the terms microevolution and macroevolution
Johann Georg Gmelin, the first researcher of Siberian flora
Alexander Gurwitsch, originated the morphogenetic field theory and discovered the biophoton
Ilya Ivanov, researcher of artificial insemination and the interspecific hybridization of animals, attempted to create a human-ape hybrid
Dmitry Ivanovsky, discoverer of viruses
Georgii Karpechenko, inventor of rabbage (the first ever non-sterile hybrid obtained through crossbreeding)
Nikolai Koltsov, discoverer of cytoskeleton
Vladimir Komarov, plant geographer, President of the Soviet Academy of Sciences, founder of the Komarov Botanical Institute
Ilya Mechnikov, pioneer researcher of immune system, probiotics and phagocytosis, coined the term gerontology, Nobel Prize in Medicine winner
Konstantin Merezhkovsky, major lichenologist, developer of symbiogenesis theory, a founder of endosymbiosis theory
Ivan Michurin, pomologist, selectionist and geneticist, practiced crossing of geographically distant plants, created hundreds of fruit cultivars
Alexander Middendorf, zoologist and explorer, studied the influence of permafrost on living beings, coined the term radula, prominent horse breeder
Victor Motschulsky, prominent researcher of beetles
Sergei Navashin, discovered double fertilization
Alexey Olovnikov, predicted existence of Telomerase, suggested the Telomere hypothesis of aging and the Telomere relations to cancer
Aleksandr Oparin, biologist and biochemist, proposed the "Primordial soup" theory of life origin, showed that many food production processes are based on biocatalysis
Heinz Christian Pander, embryologist, discovered germ layers
Peter Simon Pallas, polymath naturalist, explorer, discoverer of multiple animals, including the Pallas's cat, Pallas's squirrel, and Pallas's gull
Ivan Pavlov, founder of modern physiology, the first to research classical conditioning, Nobel Prize in Medicine winner
Vladimir Pravdich-Neminsky, published the first EEG and the evoked potential of the mammalian brain
Carl Schmidt, researcher of biochemical crystal structures, proved the chemical similarity of animal and plant cells
Boris Schwanwitsch, entomologist, applied colour patterns of insect wings to military camouflage during World War II
Ivan Sechenov, founder of electrophysiology and neurophysiology
Georg Wilhelm Steller, naturalist, participant of Vitus Bering's voyages, discoverer of Steller's jay, Steller's eider, extinct Steller's sea cow and multiple other animals
Lina Stern, pioneer researcher of blood–brain barrier
Armen Takhtajan, developer of Takhtajan system of flowering plant classification, major biogeographer
Kliment Timiryazev, plant physiologist and evolutionist, major researcher of chlorophyll
Lev Tsenkovsky, pioneer researcher of the ontogenesis of lower plants and animals
Mikhail Tsvet, inventor of chromatography
Nikolai Vavilov, botanist and geneticist, gathered the world's largest collection of plant seeds, identified the centres of origin of main cultivated plants
Sergey Vinogradsky, microbiologist, ecologist and soil scientist, pioneered the biogeochemical cycle concept, discovered lithotrophy and chemosynthesis, invented the Winogradsky column for breeding of microorganisms
Ivan Yefremov, paleontologist, sci-fi author, founded taphonomy
Sergey Zimov, creator of the Pleistocene Park

Physicians and psychologists

Vladimir Bekhterev, neuropathologist, founder of objective psychology, noted the role of the hippocampus in memory, a developer of reflexology, studied the Bekhterev's Disease
Vladimir Betz, discovered Betz cells of primary motor cortex
Sergey Botkin, major therapist and court physician
Nikolay Burdenko, major developer of neurosurgery
Konstantin Buteyko, developed the Buteyko method for the treatment of breathing disorders
Vladimir Demikhov, major pioneer of transplantology
Vladimir Filatov, ophthalmologist, corneal transplantation pioneer
Svyatoslav Fyodorov, inventor of radial keratotomy
Georgy Gause, inventor of gramicidin S and other antibiotics 
Oleg Gazenko, founder of space medicine; selected and trained Laika, the first space dog
Vera Gedroitz, first female Professor of Surgery in the world
Waldemar Haffkine, invented the first vaccines against cholera and bubonic plague
Gavriil Ilizarov, invented Ilizarov apparatus, developed distraction osteogenesis
Nikolai Korotkov, invented auscultatory blood pressure measurement, pioneered vascular surgery
Sergey Korsakov, studied the effects of alcoholism on the nervous system, described Korsakoff's syndrome, introduced paranoia concept
Aleksey Leontyev, founder of activity theory in psychology
Peter Lesgaft, founder of the modern system of physical education in Russia
Alexander Luria, co-developer of activity theory and cultural-historical psychology, major researcher of aphasia
Ilya Mechnikov, pioneer researcher of immune system, probiotics and phagocytosis; coined the term gerontology, Nobel Prize in Medicine winner
Pyotr Nikolsky, dermatologist, discoverer of Nikolsky's sign
Alexey Olovnikov, predicted existence of Telomerase, suggested the Telomere hypothesis of aging and the Telomere relations to cancer
Ivan Pavlov, founder of modern physiology, the first to research classical conditioning, Nobel Prize in Medicine winner
Nikolay Pirogov, pioneer of ether anaesthesia and modern field surgery, the first to perform anaesthesia in the field conditions, invented a number of surgical operations
Leonid Rogozov, performed an appendectomy on himself during the sixth Soviet Antarctic Expedition, a famous case of self-surgery
Grigory Rossolimo, pioneer of child neuropsychology
Ivan Sechenov, founder of electrophysiology and neurophysiology, author of the classic work Reflexes of the Brain
Victor Skumin, described Skumin syndrome
Lina Stern, pioneer researcher of blood–brain barrier
Fyodor Uglov, oldest practicing surgeon in history
Alexander Varshavsky, researched ubiquitination, Wolf Prize in Medicine winner
Luka Voyno-Yasenetsky, founder of purulent surgery, saint
Lev Vygotsky, founder of cultural-historical psychology, major contributor to child development and psycholinguistics, introduced zone of proximal development and cultural mediation concepts
Josias Weitbrecht, first to describe the construction and function of intervertebral discs
Sergei Yudin, inventor of cadaveric blood transfusion
Bluma Zeigarnik, psychiatrist, discovered the Zeigarnik effect, founded experimental psychopathology

Economists and sociologists
Alexander Chayanov, developed the consumption-labour-balance principle
Georges Gurvitch, major developer of sociology of knowledge and sociology of law
Leonid Kantorovich, mathematician and economist, founded linear programming, developed the theory of optimal allocation of resources, Nobel Prize in Economics winner
Nikolai Kondratiev, discoverer of the Kondratiev waves
Andrey Korotayev, historian, anthropologist, a founder of cliodynamics, prominent developer of social cycle theory
Gleb Krzhizhanovsky, developer of the GOELRO plan, the first Chief of Gosplan
Simon Kuznets, discovered the Kuznets swings, built the Kuznets curve, disproved the Absolute Income Hypothesis, Nobel Prize in Economics winner
Vladimir Lenin, leader of the October Revolution and founder of the Soviet Union, introduced planned economy and Leninism
Evsei Liberman, laid the scientific support for the Soviet Kosygin reform in economy
Wassily Leontief, developed input-output analysis and the Leontief paradox, Nobel Prize in Economics winner
Vasily Nemchinov, created the mathematical basis for the Soviet central planning
Grigory Orlov, founder of the Free Economic Society
Pitirim Sorokin, sociologist, a prominent developer of the social cycle theory
Stanislav Strumilin, pioneer of the planned economy, developed the first five-year plans

Historians and archaeologists

Mikhail Artamonov, historian and archaeologist, founder of modern Khazar studies, excavated a great number of Scythian and Khazar kurgans and settlements, including Sarkel
Artemiy Artsikhovsky, archaeologist, discoverer of birch bark documents in Novgorod
Vasily Bartold, turkologist, the "Gibbon of Turkestan", an archaeologist of Samarcand
Konstantin Bestuzhev-Ryumin, 19th-century historian and paleographer, founder of the Bestuzhev Courses for women
Nikita Bichurin, a founder of Sinology, published many documents on Chinese and Mongolian history, opened the first Chinese-language school in Russia
Nikolay Danilevsky, ethnologist, philosopher and historian, a founder of Eurasianism, the first to present an account of history as a series of distinct civilisations
Igor Diakonov, historian and linguist, a prominent researcher of Sumer and Assyria
Boris Farmakovsky, archaeologist of Ancient Greek colony Olbia
Vladimir Golenishchev, egyptologist, excavated Wadi Hammamat, discovered over 6,000 antiquities, including the Moscow Mathematical Papyrus, the Story of Wenamun, and various Fayum portraits
Timofey Granovsky, a founder of mediaeval studies in Russia, disproved the historicity of Vineta
Boris Grekov, major researcher of Kievan Rus' and the Golden Horde
Lev Gumilev, historian and ethnologist, prominent researcher of the ancient Central Asian peoples, related ethnogenesis and biosphere, influenced the rise of Neo-Eurasianism
Boris Hessen, physicist who brought externalism into modern historiography of science
Pyotr Kafarov, prominent sinologist,  discovered The Secret History of the Mongols
Nikolai Karamzin, sentimentalist writer and historian, author of the 12-volume History of the Russian State
Vasily Klyuchevsky, dominated Russian historiography at the turn of the 20th century, shifted focus from politics and society to geography and economy
Alexander Kazhdan, Byzantinist, editor of the Oxford Dictionary of Byzantium
Nikodim Kondakov, prominent researcher of Byzantine art
Andrey Korotayev, historian and anthropologist,  a founder of cliodynamics, a prominent developer of social cycle theory
Pyotr Kozlov, explorer of Central Asia, discoverer of the ancient Tangut city of Khara-Khoto and Xiongnu royal burials at Noin-Ula
Nikolay Likhachyov, first and foremost Russian sigillographer, major developer of auxiliary historical disciplines
Aleksey Lobanov-Rostovsky, statesman, published the major Russian Genealogical Book
Mikhail Lomonosov, polymath scientist and artist, the first opponent of the Normanist theory, published an early account of Russian history
Friedrich Martens, legal historian, drafted the Martens Clause of the Hague Peace Conference
Vladimir Minorsky, prominent historian of Persia
Yagutil Mishiev, author of books about the history of Derbent, Dagestan, Russia
Gerhardt Friedrich Müller, co-founder of the Russian Academy of Sciences, explorer and the first academic historian of Siberia, a founder of ethnography, author of the first academic account of Russian history, put forth the Normanist theory
Aleksei Musin-Pushkin, prominent collector of ancient Russian manuscripts, discoverer of The Tale of Igor's Campaign
Nestor the Chronicler, author of the Primary Chronicle (the first East Slavic chronicle) and several hagiographies, saint
Alexey Okladnikov, prominent historian and archaeologist of Siberia and Mongolia
Sergey Oldenburg, a founder of Russian Indology and the Academic Institute of Oriental Studies
George Ostrogorsky, preeminent 20th-century Byzantinist
Avraamy Palitsyn, 17th-century historian of the Time of Troubles
Anna Pankratova (1897–1957), leading Soviet historian
Evgeny Pashukanis, legal historian, wrote The General Theory of Law and Marxism
Boris Piotrovsky, prominent researcher of Urartu, Scythia, and Nubia, long-term director of the Hermitage Museum
Mikhail Piotrovsky, orientalist, current director of the Hermitage Museum
Mikhail Pogodin, leading mid-19th-century Russian historian, proponent of the Normanist theory
Mikhail Pokrovsky, Marxist historian prominent in the 1920s
Natalia Polosmak, archaeologist of Pazyryk burials, discoverer of Pazyryk Ice Maiden
Alexander Polovtsov, statesman, historian and Maecenas, founder of the Russian Historian Society
Tatyana Proskuryakova, Mayanist scholar and archaeologist, deciphered the ancient Maya script
Semyon Remezov, cartographer and the first historian of Siberia, author of the Remezov Chronicle
Mikhail Rostovtsev, archeologist and economist, the first to thoroughly examine the social and economic systems of the Ancient World, excavated Dura-Europos
Nicholas Roerich, painter, archeologist, explorer of Central Asia, initiated the international Roerich's Pact on historical monuments protection
Sergei Rudenko, discoverer of Scythian Pazyryk burials
Boris Rybakov, historian and chief Soviet archaeologist for 40 years, primary opponent of the Normanist theory
Viktor Sarianidi, discoverer of the Bactria-Margiana Archaeological Complex and the Bactrian Gold in Central Asia
Mikhail Shcherbatov, man of Russian Enlightenment, conservative historian
Sergey Solovyov, principal Russian 19th-century historian, author of the 29-volume History of Russia
Vasily Struve, orientalist and historian of the Ancient World, put forth the Marxist theory of five socio-economic formations that dominated the Soviet education
Yevgeny Tarle, author of the famous studies on Napoleon's invasion of Russia and on the Crimean War
Vasily Tatischev, statesman, geographer and historian, discovered and published the Russkaya Pravda, Sudebnik and the controversial Ioachim Chronicle; wrote the first full-scale account of Russian history
Mikhail Tikhomirov, major paleographer, published the Complete Collection of Russian Chronicles
Boris Turayev, author of the first full-scale History of Ancient East
Peter Turchin, population biologist and historian, coined the term cliodynamics
Aleksey Uvarov, founder of the first Russian archaeological society, discovered over 750 ancient kurgans
Nikolai Yadrintsev, discoverer of Genghis Khan's capital Karakorum and the Orkhon script of ancient Türks
Valentin Yanin, preeminent researcher of birch bark documents
Dmitry Yurasov, historian of soviet repression

Linguists and ethnographers

Vasily Abaev, major researcher of Iranian languages
Alexander Afanasyev, leading Russian folklorist, recorded and published over 600 Russian fairy tales, by far the largest folktale collection by any one man in the world
Ivan Baudouin de Courtenay, co-invented the concept of phoneme and the systematic treatment of linguistical alternations, pioneered synchronic analysis and mathematical linguistics
Vladimir Bogoraz, researcher of Chukchi people, founder of the Institute of the Peoples of the North
Otto von Böhtlingk, prominent Indologist and Sanskrit grammarian
Fyodor Buslaev, philologist and folklorist, representative of the Mythological school of comparative literature
Vladimir Dahl, Russian language lexicographer of the 19th century, folklorist and turkologist, author of the Explanatory Dictionary of the Live Great Russian language
Johann Gottlieb Georgi, explorer, published the first full-scale work on ethnography of indigenous peoples of Russia
Dmitry Gerasimov, medieval translator, diplomat and philologist, correspondent of European Renaissance scholars
Vladislav Illich-Svitych, founder of Nostratic linguistics
Vyacheslav Ivanov, founder of glottalic theory of Indo-European consonantism
Roman Jakobson, preeminent 20th century linguist and literary theorist, a founder of phonology, major Slavist, author of Jackobson's Communication Model
Pyotr Kafarov, prominent sinologist, developed the cyrillization of Chinese, discovered The Secret History of the Mongols
Yuri Knorozov, linguist, epigrapher and ethnographer, deciphered the Maya script, proposed a decipherment for the Indus script
Nikolay Krushevsky, co-inventor of the concept of phoneme and the systematic treatment of linguistical alternations
Gerasim Lebedev, pioneer of Indology, introduced Bengali script typing to Europe, founded the first European-style theater in India
Dmitry Likhachov, major 20th century expert on Old East Slavic and literature
Mikhail Lomonosov, polymath scientist and artist, wrote a grammar that reformed Russian literary language by combining Old Church Slavonic with vernacular tongue
Nikolay Lvov, polymath artist and scientist, compiled the first significant collection of Russian folk songs, published epic bylinas
Richard Maack, naturalist and ethnographer of Siberia
Sergey Malov, turkologist, classified the Turkic alphabets, deciphered the ancient Orkhon script
Nicholas Marr, put forth a pseudo-linguistic Japhetic theory on the origin of language
Igor Melchuk, structural linguist, author of Meaning-Text Theory
Nicholai Miklukho-Maklai, anthropologist who lived and traveled among the natives of Papua New Guinea and Pacific islands, prominent anti-racist
Semyon Novgorodov, Yakut politician and linguist, creator of written Yakut language (Sakha scripts)

Stephan of Perm, 14th century missionary, converted Komi Permyaks to Christianity and invented the Old Permic script
Yevgeny Polivanov, linguist, orientalist and polyglot, developed the cyrillization of Japanese
Nicholas Poppe, prominent Altaic-language researcher
Vladimir Propp, formalist scholar, major researcher of folk tales and mythology
Isaac Jacob Schmidt, first researcher of Mongolian language
Leopold von Schrenck, naturalist and ethnographer, coined the term Paleo-Asiatic peoples, the first director of the Peter the Great Museum of Anthropology and Ethnography
Aleksey Shakhmatov, founder of textology, prepared major 20th century reforms of Russian orthography, pioneered the systematic research of Old Russian and medieval Russian literature
Lev Shcherba, phonetician and phonologist, author of the glokaya kuzdra phrase
Fyodor Shcherbatskoy, Indologist, initiated the scholarly study of Buddhist philosophy in the West
Izmail Sreznevsky, leading 19th century Slavist, published Codex Zographensis, Codex Marianus and Kiev Fragments
Sergei Starostin, prominent supporter of Altaic theory, proposed the Dené–Caucasian languages macrofamily, reconstructed several Eurasian proto-languages
Vasily Tatischev, geographer, ethnographer and historian, compiled the first encyclopedic dictionary of Russian language
Tenevil, Chukchi reindeer herder who created a writing system for the Chukchi language
Nikolai Trubetzkoy, principal developer of phonology and inventor of morphophonology, defined phoneme, a founder of the Prague School of structural linguistics
Dmitry Ushakov, author of the academic Explanatory Dictionary of the Russian Language
Max Vasmer, leading Indo-European, Finno-Ugric and Turkic etymologist, author of the Etymological dictionary of the Russian language
Viktor Vinogradov, linguist and philologist, founder of the Russian Language Institute
Alexander Vostokov, coined the term Old Church Slavonic, discovered the Ostromir Gospel (the most ancient book in East Slavic language), pioneered the research of Russian grammar
Andrey Zaliznyak, author of the comprehensive systematic description of Russian inflection, prominent researcher of the Old Novgorod dialect and birch bark documents, proved the authenticity of the Tale of Igor's Campaign
L. L. Zamenhof, inventor of Esperanto, the most widely spoken constructed international auxiliary language

Mathematicians

Aleksandr Aleksandrov, developer of CAT(k) space and Alexandrov's uniqueness theorem in geometry
Pavel Alexandrov, author of the Alexandroff compactification and the Alexandrov topology
Dmitri Anosov, developed Anosov diffeomorphism
Vladimir Arnold, an author of the Kolmogorov–Arnold–Moser theorem in dynamical systems, solved Hilbert's 13th problem, raised the ADE classification and Arnold's rouble problems
Sergey Bernstein, developed the Bernstein polynomial, Bernstein's theorem and Bernstein inequalities in probability theory
Nikolay Bogolyubov, mathematician and theoretical physicist, author of the edge-of-the-wedge theorem, Krylov–Bogolyubov theorem, describing function and multiple contributions to quantum mechanics
Nikolai Chebotaryov, author of Chebotarev's density theorem
Pafnuti Chebyshev, prominent tutor and founding father of Russian mathematics,  contributed to probability, statistics and number theory, author of the Chebyshev's inequality, Chebyshev distance, Chebyshev function, Chebyshev equation etc.
Boris Delaunay, inventor of Delaunay triangulation, organised the first Soviet Student Olympiad in mathematics
Vladimir Drinfeld, mathematician and theoretical physicist, introduced quantum groups and ADHM construction, Fields Medal winner
Eugene Dynkin, developed Dynkin diagram, Doob–Dynkin lemma and Dynkin system in algebra and probability
Leonhard Euler, preeminent 18th century mathematician, arguably the greatest of all time, made important discoveries in mathematical analysis, graph theory and number theory, introduced much of the modern mathematical terminology and notation (mathematical function, Euler's number, Euler circles etc.)
Yevgraf Fyodorov, identified Periodic graph in geometry, the first to identify all of the 230 space groups of crystals
Boris Galerkin, developed the Galerkin method in numerical analysis
Israel Gelfand, contributed to many areas of mathematics, including group theory, representation theory and linear algebra, author of the Gelfand representation, Gelfand pair, Gelfand triple, integral geometry etc. Wolf Prize winner.
Alexander Gelfond, author of Gelfond's theorem, provided means to obtain infinite number of transcendentals, including Gelfond–Schneider constant and Gelfond's constant, Wolf Prize in Mathematics winner
Mikhail Gromov, a prominent developer of geometric group theory, inventor of homotopy principle, introduced Gromov's compactness theorems in geometry and topology, Gromov norm, Gromov product etc., Wolf Prize winner
Leonid Kantorovich, founder of linear programming, introduced the Kantorovich inequality and Kantorovich metric, developed the theory of optimal allocation of resources, Nobel Prize in Economics winner
Aleksandr Khinchin, developed the Pollaczek-Khinchine formula, Wiener–Khinchin theorem and Khinchin inequality in probability
Andrey Kolmogorov, preeminent 20th century mathematician, Wolf Prize winner; developed probability axioms, Chapman–Kolmogorov equation and Kolmogorov extension theorem in probability; Kolmogorov complexity etc.
Maxim Kontsevich, author of the Kontsevich integral and Kontsevich quantization formula, Fields Medal winner
Sofia Kovalevskaya, the first woman professor in Northern Europe and Russia, the first female professor of mathematics, discovered the Kovalevskaya top
Mark Krein, developed the Tannaka–Krein duality, Krein–Milman theorem and Krein space, Wolf Prize winner
Nikolay Krylov, author of the edge-of-the-wedge theorem, Krylov–Bogolyubov theorem and describing function
Yuri Linnik, developed Linnik's theorem in analytic number theory
Nikolai Lobachevsky, a Copernicus of Geometry who created the first non-Euclidean geometry (Lobachevskian or hyperbolic geometry)
Nikolai Lusin, developed Luzin's theorem, Luzin spaces and Luzin sets in descriptive set theory
Aleksandr Lyapunov, founder of stability theory, author of the Lyapunov's central limit theorem, Lyapunov equation, Lyapunov fractal, Lyapunov time etc.
Yuri Manin, author of the Gauss–Manin connection in algebraic geometry, Manin-Mumford conjecture and Manin obstruction in diophantine geometry
Grigory Margulis, worked on lattices in Lie groups, Wolf Prize and Fields Medal winner
Andrey Markov, invented the Markov chains, proved Markov brothers' inequality, author of the hidden Markov model, Markov number, Markov property, Markov's inequality, Markov processes, Markov random field, Markov algorithm etc.
Yuri Matiyasevich, author of Matiyasevich's theorem in set theory, provided negative solution for Hilbert's tenth problem
Pyotr Novikov, solved the word problem for groups and Burnside's problem
Sergey Novikov, worked on algebraic topology and soliton theory, developed Adams–Novikov spectral sequence and Novikov conjecture, Wolf Prize and Fields Medal winner
Andrei Okounkov, researcher of infinite symmetric groups and Hilbert scheme, Fields Medal winner
Mikhail Ostrogradsky, mathematician and physicist, author of divergence theorem and partial fractions in integration
Grigori Perelman, major contributor to Riemannian geometry and topology, proved Geometrization conjecture and Poincaré conjecture, won a Fields medal and the first Clay Millennium Prize Problems Award (declined both)
Lev Pontryagin, blind mathematician, developed Pontryagin duality and Pontryagin classes in topology, and Pontryagin's minimum principle in optimal control
Lev Schnirelmann, developed the Lusternik–Schnirelmann category in topology and Schnirelmann density of numbers
Moses Schönfinkel, inventor of combinatory logic
Yakov Sinai, developed the Kolmogorov–Sinai entropy and Sinai billiard, Wolf and Abel Prize winner
Stanislav Smirnov, prominent researcher of triangular lattice, Fields Medalist
Sergei Sobolev, introduced the Sobolev spaces and mathematical distributions, co-developed the first ternary computer Setun
Vladimir Steklov, founder of Steklov Institute of Mathematics, proved theorems on generalized Fourier series
Jakow Trachtenberg, developed the Trachtenberg system of mental calculation
Andrey Tikhonov, author of Tikhonov regularization  of ill-posed problems, Tikhonov space and Tikhonov's theorem (central in general topology), invented magnetotellurics
Pavel Urysohn, developed the metrization theorems, Urysohn's Lemma and Fréchet–Urysohn space in topology
Nicolay Vasilyev, inventor of non-Aristotelian logic, the forerunner of paraconsistent and multi-valued logics
Ivan Vinogradov, developed Vinogradov's theorem and Pólya–Vinogradov inequality in analytic number theory
Vladimir Voevodsky, introduced a homotopy theory for schemes and modern motivic cohomology, Fields Medalist
Georgy Voronoy, invented the Voronoi diagram
Dmitry Yegorov, author of Egorov's Theorem in mathematical analysis
Efim Zelmanov, solved the restricted Burnside problem, Fields Medal winner

Astronomers and cosmologists

Viktor Ambartsumian, one of the founders of theoretical astrophysics, discoverer of stellar associations, founder of Byurakan Observatory
Vladimir Belinski, an author of the BKL singularity model of the Universe
Aristarkh Belopolsky, invented a spectrograph based on the Doppler effect, among the first photographers of stellar spectra
Fyodor Bredikhin, developed the theory of comet tails, meteors and meteor showers, a director of the Pulkovo Observatory
Jacob Bruce, statesman, naturalist and astronomer, founder of the first observatory in Russia (in the Sukharev Tower)
Lyudmila Chernykh, astronomer, discovered 268 asteroids
Nikolai Chernykh, astronomer, discovered 537 asteroids and 2 comets
Alexander Fridman, discovered the Friedmann equations (metric expansion of space solution to the general relativity field equations), an author of the FLRW metric of Universe
George Gamow, discovered alpha decay via quantum tunneling and Gamow factor in stellar nucleosynthesis,  introduced the Big Bang nucleosynthesis theory, predicted cosmic microwave background
Matvey Gusev, first to prove the non-sphericity of the Moon, pioneer of photography in astronomy
Nikolai Kardashev, astrophysicist, inventor of Kardashev scale for ranking the space civilizations
Isaak Khalatnikov, an author of the BKL singularity
Marian Kowalski, first to measure the rotation of the Milky Way
Anders Johan Lexell, mathematician, researcher of celestial mechanics and comet astronomy, proved that Uranus is a planet rather than a comet
Andrei Linde, created the chaotic inflation theory of the Universe
Evgeny Lifshitz, an author of the BKL singularity
Mikhail Lomonosov polymath, invented the off-axis reflecting telescope, discovered the atmosphere of Venus
Dmitri Dmitrievich Maksutov, invented the Maksutov telescope
Viktor Safronov, author of the planetesimal hypothesis of planet formation
Grigory Shayn, first director of the Crimean Astrophysical Observatory, co-developed a method for stellar rotation measurement
Iosif Shklovsky, prominent radio astronomer, cosmic rays and extraterrestrial life researcher
Friedrich Wilhelm Struve, founder and the first director of the Pulkovo Observatory, prominent researcher of double stars, initiated the construction of 2,820 km long Struve Geodetic Arc, progenitor of the Struve family of astronomers
Otto Lyudvigovich Struve, co-developed a method for stellar rotation measurement, directed several U.S. observatories
Otto Wilhelm von Struve, director of the Pulkovo Observatory, discovered over 500 double stars
Rashid Sunyaev, co-predicted the Sunyaev–Zel'dovich effect of CMB distortion
George Volkoff, predicted the existence of neutron stars
Boris Vorontsov-Velyaminov, discovered the absorption of light by interstellar dust, author of the Morphological Catalogue of Galaxies
Ivan Yarkovsky, discovered the YORP and Yarkovsky effect of meteoroids and asteroids
Aleksandr Zaitsev, coined the term Messaging to Extra-Terrestrial Intelligence, conducted the first intercontinental radar astronomy experiment, transmitted the Cosmic Calls
Yakov Zeldovich, physicist, astrophysicist and cosmologist, the first to suggest that accretion discs around massive black holes are responsible for the quasar radiation, co-predicted the Sunyaev–Zel'dovich effect

Physicists

Alexei Abrikosov, discovered how magnetic flux can penetrate a superconductor (the Abrikosov vortex), Nobel Prize winner
Franz Aepinus,  related electricity and magnetism, proved the electric nature of pyroelectricity, explained electric polarization and electrostatic induction, invented achromatic microscope
Zhores Alferov, inventor of modern heterotransistor, Nobel Prize winner
Abram Alikhanov, a prominent researcher of cosmic rays, built the first nuclear reactors in the USSR, founder of Institute for Theoretical and Experimental Physics (ITEP)
Lev Artsimovich, builder of the first tokamak, researcher of high temperature plasma
Gurgen Askaryan, predicted self focusing of light, discovered Askaryan effect in the particle physics
Nikolay Basov, physicist, co-inventor of laser and maser, Nobel Prize winner
Nikolay Bogolyubov, co-developed the BBGKY hierarchy, formulated a microscopic theory of superconductivity, suggested a triplet quark model, introduced a new quantum degree of freedom (color charge)
Gersh Budker, invented electron cooling, co-invented collider
Sergey Chaplygin, a founder of aero- and hydrodynamics, formulated the Chaplygin's equations and Chaplygin gas concept
Pavel Cherenkov, discoverer of Cherenkov radiation, Nobel Prize winner
Yuri Denisyuk, inventor of 3D holography
Nikolay Dollezhal, designer of the reactor for the first nuclear power plant, developer of VVER-type reactors
Ludvig Faddeev, discoverer of Faddeev–Popov ghosts and Faddeev equations in quantum physics
Georgy Flyorov, an initiator of the Soviet atomic bomb project, co-discoverer of seaborgium and bohrium, founder of the Joint Institute for Nuclear Research
Vladimir Fock, developed the Fock space, Fock state and the Hartree–Fock method in quantum mechanics
Ilya Frank, explained the phenomenon of Cherenkov radiation, Nobel Prize winner
Yakov Frenkel, introduced the notion of electron hole, discovered the Frenkel defect of a crystal lattice, described the Poole–Frenkel effect in solid-state physics
Andre Geim, inventor of graphene, developer of gecko tape, Nobel Prize winner, and also Ig Nobel Prize winner for diamagnetic levitation of a living frog
Vitaly Ginzburg, co-author of the Ginzburg–Landau theory of superconductivity, a developer of hydrogen bomb, Nobel Prize winner
Vladimir Gribov, introduced pomeron, DGLAP equations and Gribov ambiguity
Abram Ioffe, founder of the Soviet physics school, tutor of many prominent scientists
Dmitri Ivanenko, proposed the first atomic nucleus and nuclear shell models, predicted the synchrotron radiation, author of the hypothesis of quark stars
Boris Jacobi, formulated the Maximum power theorem in electrical engineering, invented electroplating, electrotyping, galvanoplastic sculpture and electric boat
Pyotr Kapitsa, originated the techniques for creating ultrastrong magnetic fields, co-discovered a way to measure the magnetic field of an atomic nucleus discovered superfluidity, Nobel Prize winner
Yuly Khariton, chief designer of the Soviet atomic bomb, co-developer of the Tsar Bomb
Orest Khvolson, first to study the Chwolson ring effect of gravitational lensing
Igor Kurchatov, builder of the first nuclear power plant, developer of the first marine nuclear reactors for surface ships
Lev Landau, theoretical physicist, developed the Ginzburg–Landau theory of superconductivity, explained the Landau damping in plasma physics, pointed out the Landau pole in quantum electrodynamics, co-author of the famous Course of Theoretical Physics, Nobel Prize winner
Grigory Landsberg, co-discoverer of Raman scattering of light
Mikhail Lavrentyev, founder of the Siberian Division of the Soviet Academy of Sciences and Akademgorodok in Novosibirsk
Pyotr Lebedev, first to measure the radiation pressure on a solid body, thus privoving the Maxwell's theory of electromagnetism
Heinrich Lenz, discovered the Lenz's law of electromagnetism
Evgeny Lifshitz, an author of the BKL singularity model of the Universe, co-author of the Course of Theoretical Physics
Mikhail Lomonosov, polymath scientist, artist and inventor; proposed the law of conservation of matter, disproved the phlogiston theory
Oleg Losev, inventor of light-emitting diode and crystadine
Alexander Makarov,  inventor of orbitrap
Boris Mamyrin, inventor of reflectron
Leonid Mandelshtam, co-discoverer of Raman effect
Konstantin Novoselov, inventor of graphene, developer of gecko tape, Nobel Prize winner
Yuri Oganessian, nuclear physicist in the Joint Institute for Nuclear Research, co-discoverer of the heaviest elements in the periodic table; element Oganesson
Vasily Petrov, discoverer of electric arc, proposed arc lamp and arc welding
Boris Podolsky, an author of EPR Paradox in quantum physics
Alexander Polyakov, developed the concepts of Polyakov action, 't Hooft–Polyakov monopole and BPST instanton
Isaak Pomeranchuk, predicted synchrotron radiation
Bruno Pontecorvo, a founder of neutrino high energy physics, whose work led to the discovery of PMNS matrix
Alexander Popov, inventor of lightning detector, one of the inventors of radio, recorded the first experimental radiolocation at sea
Victor Popov, co-discoverer of Faddeev–Popov ghosts in quantum field theory
Alexander Prokhorov, co-inventor of laser and maser, Nobel Prize winner
Georg Wilhelm Richmann, inventor of electrometer, pioneer researcher of atmospheric electricity, killed by a ball lightning in experiment
Andrei Sakharov, co-developer of tokamak and the Tsar Bomb, inventor of explosively pumped flux compression generator, Nobel Peace Prize winner
Nikolay Semyonov, physical chemist, co-discovered a way to measure the magnetic field of an atomic nucleus, Nobel Prize in Chemistry winner
Lev Shubnikov, discoverer of Shubnikov–de Haas effect, one of the first researchers of solid hydrogen and liquid helium
Dmitri Skobeltsyn, first to use cloud chamber for studying cosmic rays, the first to observe positrons
Aleksandr Stoletov, inventor of photoelectric cell, built the Stoletov curve, pioneered the research of ferromagnetism
Igor Tamm, explained the phenomenon of Cherenkov radiation, co-developer of tokamak, Nobel Prize winner
Nikolay Umov, discovered the Umov–Poynting vector and Umov effect, the first to propose the formula 
Petr Ufimtsev, developed the theory that led to modern stealth technology
Sergey Vavilov, co-discoverer of Cherenkov radiation, formulated the Kasha–Vavilov rule of quantum yields
Vladimir Veksler, inventor of synchrophasotron, co-inventor of synchrotron
Evgeny Velikhov, leader of the international program ITER (thermonuclear experimental tokamak)
Alexey Yekimov, discoverer of quantum dots
Yevgeny Zavoisky, inventor of EPR spectroscopy, co-developer of NMR spectroscopy
Yakov Zeldovich, physicist and cosmologist, predicted the beta decay of a pi meson and the muon catalysis, co-predicted the Sunyaev–Zel'dovich effect of CMB distortion
Nikolai Zhukovsky, a founder of aero- and hydrodynamics, the first to study airflow, author of Joukowsky transform and Kutta–Joukowski theorem, founder of TsAGI, pioneer of aviation

Chemists and material scientists

Ernest Beaux, inventor of Chanel No. 5, "the world's most legendary fragrance"
Nikolay Beketov, inventor of aluminothermy, a founder of physical chemistry
Friedrich Konrad Beilstein, proposed the Beilstein test for halogen detection, compiled the Beilstein database in organic chemistry
Boris Belousov, discoverer of Belousov–Zhabotinsky reaction, a classical example of non-equilibrium thermodynamics
Alexander Borodin, chemist and composer, the author of the famous opera Prince Igor, discovered Borodin reaction, co-discovered Aldol reaction
Aleksandr Butlerov, discovered hexamine, formaldehyde and formose reaction (the first synthesis of sugar), the first to incorporate double bonds into structural formulae, a founder of organic chemistry and the theory of chemical structure
Dmitry Chernov, founder of modern metallography, discovered polymorphism in metals, built the iron–carbon phase diagram
Aleksei Chichibabin, discovered Chichibabin pyridine synthesis, Bodroux-Chichibabin aldehyde synthesis and Chichibabin reaction
Karl Ernst Claus, chemist and botanist, discoverer of ruthenium
Aleksandr Dianin, discovered Bisphenol A and Dianin's compound
Constantin Fahlberg, inventor of saccharin, the first artificial sweetener
Alexey Favorsky, discoverer of Favorskii rearrangement and Favorskii reaction in organic chemistry
Alexander Frumkin, a founder of modern electrochemistry, author of the theory of electrode reactions
Yevgraf Fyodorov, the first to enumerate all of the 230 space groups of crystals, thus founding the modern crystallography
Andre Geim, inventor of graphene, developer of gecko tape, Nobel Prize in Physics winner
Vladimir Ipatieff, inventor of Ipatieff bomb, a founder of petrochemistry
Isidore, legendary inventor of Russian vodka
Boris Jacobi, re-discovered and commercialized electroplating
Pyotr Kapitsa, discovered superfluidity while studying liquid helium, Nobel Prize in Physics winner
Gottlieb Kirchhoff, discoverer of glucose
Ivan Knunyants, inventor of poly-caprolactam, a developer of Soviet chemical weapons
Sergei Lebedev, inventor of polybutadiene, the first commercially viable synthetic rubber
Mikhail Lomonosov, polymath, coined the term physical chemistry, re-discovered smalt, disproved the phlogiston theory, the first to record the freezing of mercury
Aleksandr Loran,  inventor of fire fighting foam
Konstantin Novoselov, inventor of graphene, developer of gecko tape, Nobel Prize in Physics winner
Vladimir Markovnikov, author of the Markovnikov's rule in organic chemistry, discoverer of naphthenes
Dmitri Mendeleyev, invented the Periodic table of chemical elements, the first to predict the properties of elements yet to be discovered, inventor of pyrocollodion, developer of pipelines and a prominent researcher of vodka
Nikolai Menshutkin, discoverer of Menshutkin reaction in organic chemistry
Ilya Prigogine, researcher of dissipative systems, complex systems and irreversibility, Nobel Prize winner
Sergey Reformatsky, discoverer of the Reformatsky reaction in organic chemistry
Nikolay Semyonov, physical chemist, author of the chain reaction theory, Nobel Prize winner
Vladimir Shukhov, polymath, inventor of chemical cracking
Mikhail Tsvet, botanist, inventor of chromatography
Victor Veselago, the first researcher of materials with negative permittivity and permeability
Dmitry Vinogradov, inventor of the Russian porcelain
Paul Walden, discovered the Walden inversion and ethylammonium nitrate, the first room temperature ionic liquid
Alexander Zaytsev, author of the Zaitsev's rule in organic chemistry
Nikolay Zelinsky, inventor of activated charcoal gas mask in Europe during World War I, co-discoverer of Hell-Volhard-Zelinsky halogenation, a founder of petrochemistry
Nikolai Zinin, discovered benzidine, co-discovered aniline, the first President of the Russian Physical-Chemical Society

Philosophers

Imperial period

Soviet period

Modern
Elena Oznobkina, researcher and translator of Kant, Nietzsche and Husserl, theorist and critic of Russian prison system, editor of Russian edition of Index on Censorship magazine, human rights activist.

Orientalists

East Asian studies
Eliahu Eilat (1903–1990), Israeli diplomat and President of the Hebrew University of Jerusalem
Evgeny Torchinov, academic, researcher and translator of texts of Buddhism and Taoism into Russian. Founder of Chair of Eastern Philosophy at St. Petersburg State University.

Middle East studies

Art

Visual arts

Architects

Aloisio da Milano, builder of the Kremlin towers and Terem Palace
Aloisio the New, builder of the Archangel Cathedral
Gavriil Baranovsky, builder of Elisseeff Emporium and the Buddhist Temple in St Petersburg
Vasily Bazhenov, architect of the Tsaritsyno Park and the Russian State Library
Joseph Bové, chief architect of Moscow after the Fire of 1812
Vincenzo Brenna, court architect of Paul I of Russia
Alexander Brullov, builder of the Pulkovo Observatory
Charles Cameron, architect of Tsarskoye Selo and Pavlovsk Palace
Alberto Cavos, builder of the Bolshoi Theatre and the Mariinsky Theatre
Alexey Dushkin, inventor of the first deep column station
Yury Felten, mover of the Thunder Stone, maker of the Summer Garden grille, builder of St Petersburg embankments
Aristotile Fioravanti, builder of the Dormition Cathedral in Moscow
Ivan Fomin, master of Russian neoclassical revival and postconstructivism
Moisei Ginzburg, master of Constructivist architecture, founder of the OSA Group
David Grimm, builder of the Church of Maria Magdalene and Chersonesus Cathedral
Boris Iofan, grandmaster of Stalinist architecture
Matvei Kazakov, builder of the Kremlin Senate
Roman Klein, builder of the Pushkin Museum and TsUM
Alexander Kokorinov, builder of the Imperial Academy of Arts
Fyodor Kon, builder of the Smolensk Kremlin and Moscow's Bely Gorod
Nikolai Ladovsky, leader of rationalist architecture of ASNOVA
Nikolay Lvov, polymath scientist and artist, adapted rammed earth technology for northern climate, pioneered HVAC technology, built Priory Palace in Gatchina
Georg Johann Mattarnovy, architect of Kunstkamera
Auguste de Montferrand, builder of Saint Isaac's Cathedral and the Alexander Column
Arkady Mordvinov, architect of the tallest hotel in Europe
Nikolai Nikitin, engineer of the largest Soviet structures: Moscow State University, Luzhniki Stadium, The Motherland Calls and Ostankino Tower (once the world's tallest)
Vyacheslav Oltarzhevsky, architect of the All-Russia Exhibition Centre and Hotel Ukraina (Moscow)
Petrok Maly, builder of the Kitai-gorod Wall and the Ascension Church in Kolomenskoye
Anatoly Polyansky, architect of the Museum of the Great Patriotic War, Moscow
Alexander Pomerantsev, builder of the GUM and the Alexander Nevsky Cathedral, Sofia
Giacomo Quarenghi, builder of the Hermitage Theatre and Smolny Institute
Bartolomeo Rastrelli, grandmaster of Russian baroque, builder of Peterhof Palace, Saint Andrew's Church in Kiev, Smolny Convent, Catherine Palace, Winter Palace
Antonio Rinaldi, architect of Oranienbaum and Tsarskoye Selo, builder of the Marble Palace
Carlo Rossi, architect of the neoclassical ensembles of St Petersburg, author of the Russian Museum, Alexandrinsky Theater, General Staff Building in St. Petersburg
Lev Rudnev, builder of Stalinist skyscrapers
Marco Ruffo, builder of Kremlin towers and the Palace of Facets
Fyodor Schechtel, master of Art Nouveau, builder of Yaroslavsky Rail Terminal
Vladimir Shchuko, builder of the Lenin Library, master of Stalinist architecture
Aleksey Shchusev, builder of Lenin's Mausoleum on Red Square and the Hotel Moskva (Moscow)
Vladimir Sherwood, builder of the State Historical Museum
Vladimir Shukhov, engineer-polymath, inventor of breakthrough industrial designs( hyperboloid structure, thin-shell structure, tensile structure, gridshell), builder of Shukhov Towers and multiple other structures
Pietro Antonio Solari, builder of the Spasskaya tower and the Palace of Facets
Vasily Stasov, inventor of the Russian Revival style, builder of the Moscow Triumphal Gates and Narva Triumphal Gates
Andrei Stackenschneider, builder of the Mariinsky Palace and Beloselsky-Belozersky Palace
Ivan Starov, builder of the Tauride Palace
Vladimir Tatlin, author of Tatlin's Tower project
Konstantin Thon, builder of the Grand Kremlin Palace, Kremlin Armoury and the Cathedral of Christ the Saviour (the world's tallest Orthodox church)
Domenico Trezzini, the first architect of St Petersburg, builder of the Peter and Paul Fortress, Summer Palace of Peter the Great, Twelve Collegia and Peter and Paul Cathedral (the world's tallest Orthodox belltower)
Vesnin brothers, leaders of constructivist architecture
Andrey Voronikhin, builder of the Kazan Cathedral and Saint Petersburg Mining Institute
Postnik Yakovlev, builder of Saint Basil's Cathedral on Red Square
Andreyan Zakharov, builder of the Russian Admiralty
Mikhail Zemtsov, architect of Catherinethal
Pyotr Baranovsky, preservationist of ancient Russian architecture, notable for saving Saint Basil's Cathedral from destruction by the Soviet authorities in the 1930s.

Sculptors and jewellers

Mikhail Anikushin, monumentalist, author of celebrated statues of Pushkin
Mihail Chemiakin, author of Children Are the Victims of Adult Vices
Peter Clodt, famous for equestrian statues, author of the Anichkov Bridge Horse Tamers
Vasily Demut-Malinovsky, author of the chariot groups on the Narva Triumphal Gates and the General Staff Building in St. Petersburg
Peter Carl Fabergé, jeweller, creator of the Fabergé Eggs
Naum Gabo, sculptor, pioneer of kinetic art
Mikhail Gerasimov, forensic sculptor, reconstructed the appearance of Tamerlane, Yaroslav the Wise, Rudaki and many other historical figures
Ilya Kabakov, conceptual installation artist
Vyacheslav Klykov, author of the monuments to Marshal Zhukov, Saints Cyril and Methodius, the Battle of Kursk
Sergey Konenkov, sculptor, "the Russian Rodin"
Mikhail Kozlovsky, neoclassical sculptor, author of the Samson fountain in Peterhof and monument to Suvorov the Mars
Ivan Martos, author of the Monument to Minin and Pozharsky on Red Square
Mikhail Mikeshin, author of the Millennium of Russia, the monument to Catherine II in St Petersburg, the monument to Bohdan Khmelnytsky in Kyiv
Vera Mukhina, sculptor, inventor of welded sculpture, author of the Worker and Kolkhoz Woman
Andrei Molodkin (born 1966), sculpture and installation
Ernst Neizvestny,  author of the Lotus Flower at the Aswan Dam in Egypt
Alexander Opekushin, author of early monuments to Pushkin, Lermontov, Aleksandr II
Boris Orlovsky, author of the statues of Kutuzov and Barclay de Tolly in front of Kazan Cathedral, St. Petersburg
Avenir Sumin, competitor of Fabergé
Nikolai Tomsky, author of multiple Lenin statues and the Tomb of the Unknown Soldier (Moscow)
Zurab Tsereteli, author of the Peter the Great Statue, To the Struggle Against World Terrorism, St. George statues at the Moscow War Memorial and the Freedom Monument (Tbilisi)
Yevgeny Vuchetich, author of the Soviet War Memorial in Berlin, Let Us Beat Swords into Plowshares in the New York UN garden, and The Motherland Calls in Volgograd

Painters

Ivan Aivazovsky, author of The Ninth Wave and over 6000 paintings, mostly seascapes
Fyodor Alekseyev, prominent landscapist, "the Russian Canaletto"
Ivan Argunov, major 18th century portraitist
Léon Bakst, stage and costume designer for the Ballets Russes, author of the Terror Antiquus
Alexandre Benois, artist and art critic, influential stage designer, author of the celebrated illustrations to Pushkin's Bronze Horseman
Ivan Bilibin, painter and stage designer, famous for illustrations of Slavic mythology and sets for Russian fairy tale-based Russian operas
Victor Borisov-Musatov, post-impressionist painter, creator of Russian Symbolism
Vladimir Borovikovsky, famous portraitist at the turn of the 19th century
Karl Briullov, neoclassical painter, author of The Last Day of Pompeii
Marc Chagall, polymath-artist, pioneer of modernism and figurative art, author of famous stained glasses
Pavel Chistyakov, history and portrait painter, tutor of many celebrated artists
Alexander Deyneka, master of socialist realism, author of the mosaics at Mayakovskaya (Moscow Metro)
Dionisy, medieval icon painter, author of frescoes in the Ferapontov Monastery
Julia Dolgorukova, painter, landscapist, famous for works on stage, costume designer and new synthetic technologies in painting   
Andrey Esionov, painter
Vladimir Favorsky, graphic artist, famous for woodcut illustrations of classic books
Pavel Fedotov, realist painter, "the Russian Hogarth"
Nikolai Ge, realist painter, famous for works on historical and religious motifs
Feofan Grek, medieval fresco and icon-painter in Byzantine Empire and Russia
Alexander Ivanov, neoclassical painter, author of The Appearance of Christ before the People
Sergey Ivanov, author of famous illustrations of Russian history
Wassily Kandinsky, inventor of pure abstract art, founder of Der Blaue Reiter
Orest Kiprensky, romantic painter and portraitist
Konstantin Korovin, leading Russian impressionist painter
Ivan Kramskoi, painter and art critic, author of the Christ in the Desert and the Unknown Woman
Boris Kustodiev, author of famous portraits, holiday scenes and "Kustodiev's women" (The Merchant's Wife, Bathing, The Russian Venus)
Mikhail Larionov, avant-garde painter, inventor of rayonism
Alexei Leonov, cosmonaut and painter, made some of his works in outer space
Isaac Levitan, landscapist, author of the Over Eternal Peace
Rafail Sergeevich Levitsky, Peredvizhniki artist and court photographer to the Romanov dynasty
El Lissitzky, avant-garde painter, typographer, author of Beat the Whites with the Red Wedge
Konstantin Makovsky, famous for idealized history paintings
Kazimir Malevich, inventor of suprematism, author of the Black Square
Sergey Malyutin, painter and folk artist, designed the first matryoshka doll
Vladimir Mayakovsky, futurist poet and propaganda artist, author of the Rosta Windows agitprop
Mikhail Nesterov, religious symbolist painter, portraitist, author of The Vision of the Youth Bartholomew
Ivan Nikitin, famous Petrine era portraitist
Vasily Perov, realist painter, author of the Troika and The Hunters at Rest
Kuzma Petrov-Vodkin, symbolist painter, author of the Bathing of a Red Horse
Vasily Polenov, landscape painter, author of A courtyard in Moscow and Grandma's garden
Ilya Repin, archetypical Russian painter, famous for his portraits and history scenes, author of the Barge Haulers on the Volga and the Reply of the Zaporozhian Cossacks
Alexander Rodchenko, avant-garde artist, graphic designer and constructivist painter
Nicholas Roerich, artist, scientist, traveler, public figure, initiator of the international Roerich Pact, author of over 7000 paintings
Andrei Rublev, most famous Russian icon-painter, author of the Trinity
Andrei Ryabushkin, history painter, works devoted mostly to the 17th century Russia
Alexei Savrasov, landscape painter, creator of the lyrical landscape style
Zinaida Serebriakova, the most prolific woman painter of Russia, famous for female portraits and nudes
Valentin Serov, impressionist painter, portraitist, author of The Girl with Peaches and The Kidnapping of Europe
Taras Shevchenko, romantic poet and painter
Ivan Shishkin, author of the most celebrated Russian landscapes: the Morning in a Pine Forest, Rye Fields, the Rain in an Oak Forest
Konstantin Somov, prominent Russian literature illustrator
Vasily Surikov, author the famous Russian history paintings: The Morning of Streltsy's Execution, Boyarynya Morozova, The March of Suvorov through the Alps
Vasily Tropinin,  romantic and realist portraitist
Israel Tsvaygenbaum, painter 
Simon Ushakov, prolific late 17th century icon painter, author of the Saviour Not Made by Hands
Feodor Vasilyev, lyrical landscape painter
Apollinary Vasnetsov, Russian history illustrator, many works devoted to Moscow
Viktor Vasnetsov, famous for Russian history and Slavic mythology images, inventor of budenovka, author of the Flying Carpet,  Tsar Ivan The Terrible, the Bogatyrs
Alexey Venetsianov, prominent genre painter, founder of the "Venetsianov school"
Vasily Vereshchagin, battle painter, author of The Apotheosis of War and the Blowing from Guns in British India
Romanov Viktor (born 1959), painter
Mikhail Vrubel, leader of the Russian Symbolism, author of The Demon Sitting and The Swan Princess
Nikolai Yaroshenko, realist genre painter and portraitist
Pyotr Zakharov-Chechenets, portrait painter of Chechen origin
Leon Zernitsky, illustrator and artist
Karp Zolotaryov, late 17th century icon painter, notable for realistic style

Literature

Novel and short story authors

Chinghiz Aitmatov, Kyrgyz and Russian writer, author of Jamilya
Vasily Aksyonov, author of the Moscow saga Generations of Winter
Boris Akunin, famous for his detective fiction, author of The Diamond Chariot
Sholem Aleichem, important Russian Jewish writer, the famous musical Fiddler on the Roof was based on Aleichem's story Tevye the Dairyman
Isaac Babel, well-known Russian Jewish writer, author of The Odessa Tales
Andrei Bely, author of the novel Petersburg, poet
Alexander Belyayev, major science fiction writer, author of Amphibian Man and Ariel
Valery Bryusov, important symbolist writer, author of the novel The Fiery Angel
Mikhail Bulgakov, author of The Master and Margarita, which The Times of London has called one of the masterpieces of the 20th century
Kir Bulychev, author of the science fiction anthology Half a Life
Ivan Bunin, short story writer and poet, first Russian to be awarded the Nobel Prize for Literature
Anton Chekhov, famous for his short stories and plays; author of The Lady with the Dog, The Black Monk
Nikolai Chernyshevsky, influential revolutionary writer, author of What Is to Be Done?
Fyodor Dostoevsky, author of Crime and Punishment, The Idiot, The Possessed, The Brothers Karamazov
Sergei Dovlatov, Russian writer who emigrated to the US, author of the novel Affiliate
Dmitry Glukhovsky, author of the post-apocalyptic novel Metro 2033
Nikolai Gogol, considered the "father" of Russian realism, author of The Overcoat, The Nose, Dead Souls
Ivan Goncharov, author of Oblomov
Maxim Gorky, founder of socialist realism, author of Twenty-six Men and a Girl
Vasily Grossman, author of Life and Fate, described by Le Monde as "the greatest Russian novel of the twentieth century"
Ilf and Petrov popular satirists, authors of The Twelve Chairs
Nikolai Karamzin, prominent sentimentalist writer and major historian, author of Poor Liza
Valentin Katayev, author of the industrial novel Time, Forward!
Veniamin Kaverin, author of the social and adventure novel The Two Captains
Daniil Kharms, Soviet surrealist and absurdist writer
Mikhail Lermontov, author of A Hero of our Time, poet
Nikolai Leskov, author of Lefty and Lady Macbeth of Mtsensk
Sergey Lukyanenko, most popular contemporary Russian sci-fi writer, author of the Night Watch
Vladimir Nabokov, author of Lolita, which was ranked at #4 on the list of the Modern Library 100 Best Novels
Nikolay Nosov, children's writer, author of the popular Neznaika series
Vladimir Obruchev, geologist and explorer, author of the science fiction and travel novels Plutonia and Sannikov Land
Yuri Olesha, author of the innovative novel Envy
Nikolai Ostrovsky, socialist realist writer, best known for his novel How the Steel Was Tempered
Boris Pasternak, author of Doctor Zhivago, poet and translator, Nobel Prize winner (was forced to decline the prize)
Viktor Pelevin, postmodernist writer, author of the short novel Omon Ra
Andrei Platonov, author of The Foundation Pit
Aleksandr Pushkin, the greatest Russian poet, novelist, author of The Captain's Daughter
Alexander Radishchev, radical writer, author of Journey from St. Petersburg to Moscow
Ayn Rand, creator of Objectivism, author of The Fountainhead, and Atlas Shrugged
Varlam Shalamov, Gulag survivor, author of Kolyma Tales
Mikhail Sholokhov, Nobel Prize for Literature, author of And Quiet Flows the Don
Aleksandr Solzhenitsyn, Nobel Prize for Literature, author of One Day in the Life of Ivan Denisovich
Vladimir Sorokin, one of the most popular writers in modern Russian literature
Boris and Arkady Strugatsky, collaborative duo of Soviet science fiction writers
Tatyana Tolstaya, writer, TV host, publicist, novelist, and essayist from the Tolstoy family
Aleksey Nikolayevich Tolstoy, Soviet writer, best known for his works of science fiction, author of Aelita
Leo Tolstoy, widely considered to be one of the world's greatest novelists, author of War and Peace,  Anna Karenina, and The Death of Ivan Ilyich
Ivan Turgenev, author of A Sportsman's Sketches, which had an influence on the abolition of serfdom in Russia
Yury Tynyanov, important member of the Russian Formalist school, author of Lieutenant Kijé
Eduard Uspensky, children's writer known for his fictional characters Gena the Crocodile and Cheburashka
Vladimir Voinovich, author of the well-known novel The Life and Extraordinary Adventures of Private Ivan Chonkin
Ivan Yefremov, paleontologist and science fiction writer, founder of taphonomy, author of The Land of Foam, Andromeda: A Space-Age Tale and Thais of Athens
Yevgeny Zamyatin, author of the dystopian novel We, which influenced George Orwell's Nineteen Eighty-Four, and Ayn Rand's Anthem

Philosophers and critics

Mikhail Bakhtin,  philosopher, literary critic, semiotician, and scholar who worked on literary theory, ethics, and the philosophy of language
Mikhail Bakunin, well-known revolutionary and theorist of collectivist anarchism
Vissarion Belinsky, influential critic, and editor of two major literary magazines: Otechestvennye Zapiski, and Sovremennik
Nikolai Berdyaev, religious and political philosopher
Helena Blavatsky, founder of Theosophy and the Theosophical Society
Alexander Bogdanov, physician, philosopher, science fiction writer, and a key figure in the early history of the Bolsheviks
Nikolay Chernyshevsky, famous for his philosophical novel What is To Be Done?, he was the leader of the revolutionary democratic movement of the 1860s, and an influence on Vladimir Lenin
Nikolay Danilevsky, naturalist, economist, ethnologist, philosopher, historian, and ideologue of the pan-Slavism and Slavophile movements
Sergei Diaghilev, art critic and impresario
Nikolay Dobrolyubov, literary critic, journalist, and revolutionary democrat
Pavel Florensky, Orthodox theologian, philosopher, mathematician, electrical engineer, and inventor
Leonid Grinin, important modern sociologist and philosopher of history
Alexander Herzen, highly influential proponent of populism, socialism, and collectivization
Mikhail Katkov, conservative journalist and literary critic influential during the reign of Alexander III
Ivan Kireyevsky, literary critic and philosopher, co-founder of the Slavophile movement
Aleksey Khomyakov, religious poet and philosopher, co-founder of the Slavophile movement, coined the term sobornost
Peter Kropotkin, naturalist, geographer and one of the world's foremost anarcho-communists
Pyotr Lavrov, prominent Russian philosopher, publicist, sociologist, and theorist of narodism
Konstantin Leontiev, conservative, monarchist reactionary philosopher
Aleksei Losev, one of the most prominent figures in Russian philosophical and religious thought of the 20th century
Nikolay Novikov, writer and philanthropist, a man of Russian Enlightenment, often considered to be the first Russian journalist
Peter D. Ouspensky, esoteric philosopher, author of In Search of the Miraculous
Dmitri Pisarev, radical writer and social critic whose works had an important influence on Lenin
Ayn Rand, Objectivist philosopher, best known for her novels The Fountainhead and Atlas Shrugged
Lev Shestov, influential Ukrainian/Russian existentialist philosopher, author of the well-known works Penultimate Words and All Things are Possible
Vladimir Solovyov, philosopher, poet, pamphleteer, and literary critic, who played a significant role in the development of Russian philosophy and poetry at the end of the 19th century
Vladimir Stasov, preeminent 19th century art critic in Russia
Leo Tolstoy, Christian anarchist and pacifist, whose ideas and social writings were the basis of the Tolstoyan movement.
Leon Trotsky, Bolshevik, and Marxist, one of the leaders of the Russian Revolution of 1917

Playwrights

Leonid Andreyev, author of many popular plays, including He Who Gets Slapped
Hizgil Avshalumov, soviet novelist, poet and playwright
Mikhail Bulgakov, popular Soviet writer, author of the play Flight
Anton Chekhov, famous for his short stories and plays, author of The Cherry Orchard, Uncle Vanya, Three Sisters, The Seagull
Denis Fonvizin, known chiefly for his famous play The Minor
Nikolai Gogol, author of the great satirical play The Government Inspector
Maxim Gorky, author of The Lower Depths, a hallmark of socialist realism
Aleksandr Griboyedov, author of the popular play Woe from Wit
Mikhail Lermontov, author of the play Masquerade
Vladimir Mayakovsky, one of the foremost representatives of Russian FuturismAlexander Ostrovsky, known for his plays dealing with the merchant class, most notably The StormAleksey Pisemsky, realist writer, author of the well-known play A Bitter Fate, considered to be the first Russian realistic tragedy
Alexander Pushkin, Russia's national poet, also known for his plays, including Boris Godunov and The Stone GuestAlexander Sumarokov, poet and playwright who single-handedly created classical theatre in Russia
Aleksey Konstantinovich Tolstoy, author of historical dramas, including The Death of Ivan the Terrible and Tsar Fyodor IoannovichLeo Tolstoy, one of the greatest Russian writers, author of the plays The Power of Darkness, The Fruits of Enlightenment, and The Living CorpseIvan Turgenev, author of the well known play A Month in the CountryPoets

 Anna Akhmatova, modernist poet, author of Requiem Bella Akhmadulina, Soviet and Russian poet who has been cited by Joseph Brodsky as the best living poet in the Russian language
 Innokenty Annensky, poet, critic, and translator, representative of the first wave of Russian Symbolism
 Konstantin Balmont, symbolist poet, one of the major figures of the Silver Age of Russian Poetry
 Evgeny Baratynsky, lauded by Alexander Pushkin as the finest Russian elegiac poet, rediscovered by Anna Akhmatova and Joseph Brodsky as a supreme poet of thought.
 Konstantin Batyushkov, an important precursor of Alexander Pushkin
 Andrey Bely, symbolist poet, namesake of the important Andrei Bely Prize.
 Alexander Blok, leader of the Russian Symbolist movement, author of "The Twelve"
 Joseph Brodsky, winner of the 1987 Nobel Prize in Literature
 Korney Chukovsky, one of the most popular children's poets in the Russian language
 Denis Davydov, guerilla fighter and soldier-poet of the Napoleonic Wars, invented a genre of hussar poetry noted for its hedonism and bravado
 Gavrila Derzhavin, one of the greatest Russian poets before Alexander Pushkin
 Aleksandr Drakokhrust, Soviet poet
 Gabriel El-Registan, one of the writers of the National Anthem of the Soviet Union
 Afanasy Fet, had a profound influence on the Russian Symbolists, especially Annensky and Blok
 Nikolay Gumilyov, founded the acmeism movement
 Vyacheslav Ivanov, poet and playwright associated with the Russian Symbolism movement
 Antiochus Kantemir, Russian poet-satirist, activist of early Russian Enlightenment
 Velimir Khlebnikov, influential member of the Russian Futurist movement, regarded by his contemporariesas as "a poet's poet"
 Ivan Krylov, Russia's best known fabulist
 Yuri Kublanovsky, poet, essayist, critic and art historian
 Mikhail Lermontov, most important Russian poet after Alexander Pushkin's death, his influence on later Russian literature is still felt in modern times
 Osip Mandelstam, Acmeist poet, author of Tristia Vladimir Mayakovsky, among the most important representatives of early-20th century Russian Futurism
 Apollon Maykov, his lyrical poems often showcase images of Russian villages, nature, and Russian history
 Nikolai Nekrasov, one of Russia's most popular poets, author of the long poem Who is Happy in Russia?
 Boris Pasternak, author of the influential poem My Sister Life, Nobel Prize winner (was forced to decline the prize)
 Nikolai Ogarev, known to every Russian, not only as a poet, but as the fellow-exile and collaborator of Alexander Herzen on Kolokol, a newspaper printed in England and smuggled into Russia
 Yakov Polonsky, leading Pushkinist poet
 Symeon of Polotsk, academically trained Baroque Belarusian born Russian poet
 Alexander Pushkin, greatest Russian poet, author of Eugene Onegin Ilya Selvinsky, leader of the Constructivist movement
 Igor Severyanin, Russian lyrical poet who presided over the circle of the so-called Ego-Futurists.
 Boris Slutsky, one of the most important representatives of the War generation of Russian poets
 Fyodor Sologub, influential symbolist poet and writer
 Aleksey Konstantinovich Tolstoy, popular poet and dramatist, known for his humorous and satirical verse
 Vasily Trediakovsky, helped lay the foundations of classical Russian literature
 Marina Tsvetaeva, known primarily for her lyric poetry, widely admired by her fellow poets
 Aleksandr Tvardovsky, chief editor of Novy Mir for many years, author of Vasili Tyorkin Fyodor Tyutchev, romantic poet, author of The Last Love Maximilian Voloshin, Symbolist poet, famous freemason
 Pyotr Yershov, author of the famous fairy-tale poem The Humpbacked Horse Sergei Yesenin, one of the most popular and well-known Russian poets of the 20th century
 Yevgeny Yevtushenko, Soviet/Russian poet, director of several films
 Nikolay Zabolotsky, one of the founders of the Russian avant-garde absurdist group OBERIU
 Vasily Zhukovsky, credited with introducing the Romantic Movement to Russian literature

Performing arts

Actors

Vera Alentova, known for her leading role in the famous 1980 Soviet drama Moscow Does Not Believe in TearsSergei Bodrov, Jr., played lead roles in several popular movies, son of playwright, actor, director and producer Sergei Bodrov
Sergei Bondarchuk, acted in and directed the Academy Award-winning 1966–67 film production of War and PeaceYul Brynner, won the Academy Award for best actor in the 1956 film The King and IArmen Dzhigarkhanyan, played in more than 170 films, founded his own theater in Moscow
Leonid Filatov, received many awards, including the Russian Federation State Prize and People's Artist of Russia in 1996
Milla Jovovich, actress, model, and musician, best known for her role in the widely popular Resident Evil movies
Lila Kedrova, winner of the Academy Award for Best Supporting Actress in 1964 for the role of Mme Hortense in Zorba the Greek.
Nikita Mikhalkov, co-wrote, directed and acted in the Academy Award-winning film Burnt by the SunHelen Mirren, British actress born to Russian father and English mother.
Lubov Orlova, theatre actress and gifted singer, the first recognized star of Soviet cinema
Marina Orlova, host of the most popular YouTube guru channel, HotForWordsArkady Raikin, stand-up comedian who led the school of Soviet and Russian humorists for about half a century
Tatiana Samoylova (1934–2014), actress
Alexander Slastin, actor, best known for his role as Soviet general Vasily Chuikov in the 2004 film Downfall
Georgy Vitsin, comic actor, best known for his comic roles such as  Trus (Coward), a member of an antihero comic trio in a series of films by Leonid Gaidai
Fyodor Volkov, 18th century actor and founder of the first permanent Russian theater
Natalie Wood, three-time Academy Award nominee, winner of the Golden Globe Award for her role in the TV series From Here to EternityVladimir Zharikov, actor, stuntman, cinematographer

Theatre directors

Michael Chekhov, Russian-American actor, director, author, and theatre practitioner, nephew of Anton Chekhov
Anatoly Efros, famous Russian and Soviet theatre director, collaborated with the stage director Yury Lyubimov
Yury Lyubimov, Soviet and Russian stage actor and director associated with the Taganka Theatre which he founded
Vladimir Nemirovich-Danchenko, theatre director, writer, pedagogue, playwright, producer, and co-founder of the Moscow Art Theatre
Konstantin Stanislavski, famous actor, theatre director, creator of a widely used system of acting, and co-founder of the Moscow Art Theatre
Yevgeny Vakhtangov, friend and mentor of Michael Chekhov, founded the Vakhtangov Theatre
Fyodor Volkov, actor and founder of the first permanent Russian theater

Film directors and animators

Lev Atamanov, animation director of Soyuzmultfilm, best known for The Snow Queen
Fyodor Bondarchuk, director of the acclaimed film The 9th Company, son of Sergei Bondarchuk
Grigori Chukhrai, Academy Award nominee for Best Original Screenplay for the film Ballad of a SoldierPavel Chukhrai, Academy Award nominee for Best Foreign Language Film for The ThiefAlexander Dovzhenko, often cited as one of the most important early Soviet filmmakers
Sergei Eisenstein, his work profoundly influenced early filmmakers owing to his innovative use of and writings about montage
Vasily Goncharov, directed the first Russian feature film Defence of SevastopolLeonid Gaidai, his movies broke theatre attendance records and are still some of the top-selling DVDs in Russia
Roman Kachanov, one of the founders and leaders of Russian stop-motion animation
Andrei Konchalovsky, director of popular movies including Runaway Train and Tango & CashFjodor Khitruk, one of the most influential Russian animators and animation directors
Elem Klimov, best known for his film Come and SeeGrigori Kozintsev, known for his silent films and adaptations of Shakespeare
Lev Kuleshov, taught at and helped establish the world's first film school (the Moscow Film School)
Aleksandr Petrov, won the Academy Award for Animated Short Film for The Old Man and the SeaYakov Protazanov, one of the founding fathers of Russian cinema
Aleksandr Ptushko, referred to as "the Soviet Walt Disney", due to his prominent early role in animation in the Soviet Union
Mikhail Romm, director and teacher, known for his film Nine Days in One YearEldar Ryazanov, Soviet/Russian director famous for his comedies
Karen Shakhnazarov, chairman of Mosfilm, one of the largest and oldest film studios in Russia
Vasily Shukshin, actor, writer, screenwriter and movie director who specialized in rural themes
Alexander Sokurov, critically acclaimed director, a regular at the Cannes Film Festival
Ladislas Starevich, Russian and French stop-motion animator who used insects and animals as his protagonists
Genndy Tartakovsky, Russian-American animator best known for Dexter's Laboratory, Samurai Jack, and Star Wars: Clone WarsAndrei Tarkovsky, internationally renowned director and film theorist
Dziga Vertov, pioneering documentary film director and writer

Ballet dancers and choreographers

Irina Baronova, ballerina, choreographer
Mikhail Baryshnikov, ballet dancer
Sergei Diaghilev, ballet impresario
Irina Dvorovenko, ballet dancer
Michel Fokine, choreographer, dancer
Elizaveta Gerdt, ballerina
Pavel Gerdt, dancer
Alexander Godunov, ballet dancer
Tamara Karsavina, ballerina
Mathilde Kschessinska, prima ballerina
Natalia Makarova, ballerina
Vaslav Nijinsky, ballet dancer, choreographer
Ivan Novikoff, ballet master
Rudolf Nureyev, ballet dancer
Valery Panov, ballet dancer, choreographer
Anna Pavlova, ballerina
Maya Plisetskaya, ballerina
Olga Preobrajenska, ballerina
Tatiana Riabouchinska, ballerina
Yuri Soloviev, ballet dancer
Galina Ulanova, ballerina
Agrippina Vaganova, ballet teacher
Svetlana Zakharova, ballerina
Maria Khoreva, ballet dancer

Classical composers and musicians

Alexander Vasilyevich Alexandrov, composer
Anton Arensky, composer
Mily Balakirev, composer
Alexander Borodin, composer
Sergei Bortkiewicz, composer
Valeri Brainin, composer, musical scientist
César Cui, composer
Maria Eklund, conductor
Michael L. Geller, composer, viola player
Valery Gergiev, pianist, conductor
Emil Gilels, pianist
Alexander Glazunov, composer
Mikhail Glinka, composer of Russlan and LudmillaNikolai Golovanov, conductor
Alexander Gretchaninoff, composer
Vladimir Horowitz, pianist
Dmitry Kabalevsky, composer
Aram Khachaturian, composer
Tikhon Khrennikov, composer
Leonid Kogan, violinist
Anatoly Konstantinovich Lyadov, composer
Sergei Lyapunov, composer
Nikolai Medtner, composer, pianist
Modest Mussorgsky, composer of Boris Godunov, Pictures at an ExhibitionNikolai Myaskovsky, composer
Natasha Paremski, pianist
Mikhail Pletnev, pianist
Gregor Piatigorsky, composer
Sergei Prokofiev, composer, pianist and conductor
Sergei Rachmaninoff, pianist, composer, conductor
Vadim Repin, violinist
Sviatoslav Richter, pianist
Nikolai Rimsky-Korsakov, composer
Mstislav Rostropovich, cellist and conductor
Gennady Rozhdestvensky, conductor
Nikolai Rubinstein, pianist, conductor and composer
Alexei Rumiantsev, pianist, composer
Vasily Ilyich Safonov, composer and music educator
Alfred Schnittke, composer
Alexander Scriabin, composer and pianist
Dmitri Shostakovich, composer and pianist
Igor Stravinsky, composer
Alexander Serov, composer
Rodion Shchedrin, composer
Vissarion Shebalin, composer
Regina Spektor, musician
Georgy Sviridov, composer
Aleksandr Taneyev, composer
Sergey Taneyev, composer
Mikael Tariverdiev, composer
Pyotr Tchaikovsky, composer
Boris Tchaikovsky, composer
Alexander Tcherepnin, composer
Galina Ustvolskaya, composer
Maxim Vengerov, violinist

Opera and choir singers

Nikolay Baskov, opera singer
Evgeny Belyaev, singer
Feodor Chaliapin, opera singer

Anna Netrebko, opera singer
Elena Pankratova, opera singer
Vladimir Rosing, singer, director
Elizabeth Sandunova, opera singer
Dmitri Hvorostovsky, opera singer

Modern musicians, singers and bands

Yuri Antonov, composer, singer
Sasha Argov (1914–95), composer 
Dima Bilan, composer, Eurovision winner
Polina Gagarina, Singer, Eurovision runner-up
Lena Katina, singer of musical duo t.A.T.u.
Eduard Khil (1934–2012), singer
Philipp Kirkorov, pop singer
Sergey Lazarev, vocalist
Origa, singer, performs theme songs for various anime series
Natalia O'Shea, linguist, songwriter, musician (Irish harp, guitar), vocalist and leader of the bands Melnitsa (folk-rock) and Clann Lir (traditional Celtic folk)
Aleksandra Pakhmutova, composer
Alla Pugacheva, singer and composer
Second Hand Band, musical group from Moscow
Andrey Shibko (born 1975), pianist
Regina Spektor, musician
Valery Leontiev, singer
Viktor Tsoi, poet, composer, musician, actor in the 1980s
Julia Volkova, singer of musical duo t.A.T.u.
Vladimir Vysotsky (1938–80), poet, composer, musician, actor in the 1970s
KREC, rap band from St. Petersburg
Alyona Shvets, pop singer

Radio and TV people

Joe Adamov, journalist and presenter on Radio Moscow and its successor the Voice of Russia for over 60 years
Nikolai Fomenko, musician, comic actor, showman and motor racer, president of Marussia Motors company which produces the first Russian supercar, MarussiaMaxim Galkin, parodist, singer and host for the Russian adaptations of Who Wants to Be a Millionaire? from 2001 to 2008, and The Million Pound DropIgor Kirillov, for 30 years a news anchor of the Soviet Central Television's prime time news program VremyaMikhail Leontyev, political pundit on national TV Channel One, host and author of the program OdnakoVladislav Listyev, arguably the most renowned Russian journalist and TV anchor in the 1980s and 1990s, the first director of the Channel One, founder of the Pole Chudes and other popular TV shows
Alexander Maslyakov, for over 45 years the host for the humour game show KVNYevgeny Petrosyan, popular stand-up comedian and host of a number of humour TV shows
Vladimir Posner, political pundit and host on radio and TV, for many years working in the United States, Soviet Union and Russia
Yuri Senkevich, participant of Thor Heyerdahl's voyages, anchorman of the Travelers' Club show for the record 30 years
Margarita Simonyan, journalist, editor-in-chief of RT (Russia Today)
Kseniya Sobchak, TV celebrity, host for a number of popular programs, Russia's "It girl" and "Russia's Paris Hilton"
Roman Trakhtenberg, actor, popular host of humour shows on radio and TV, an expert on Russian jokes
Vladimir Turchinsky, bodybuilder, TV and radio presenter, actor and singer
Ivan Urgant, showman and actor, host of many popular Russian TV shows and ceremonies, such as Projectorparishilton and 2009 Eurovision Song Contest
Vladimir Voroshilov, author, producer and anchorman of the intellectual game show What? Where? When? from 1975 to 2000
Leonid Yakubovich, actor and TV anchorman, the host for the Pole Chudes show for 20 years
Anatoly Wasserman, erudite, journalist and political pundit, a frequent winner of intellectual TV games such as What? Where? When? and Svoya Igra (Russian version of Jeopardy!)
Mikhail Zadornov, stand-up comedian and writer, particularly famous for his satirical comparisons of Russians and nationals of other countries, especially Americans

Fashion models

Alena Shishkova, Miss Russia 2012 runner up
Irina Antonenko, Miss Russia 2010
Oxana Fedorova, Miss Universe
Ksenia Kahnovich
Polina Kouklina
Tatiana Kovylina
Irina Kulikova
Elena Melnik
Sasha Pivovarova
Natasha Polevshchikova
Vlada Roslyakova
Anna Selezneva
Irina Shaykhlislamova
Katya Shchekina
Tatiana Sorokko
Natasha Stefanenko, model and actress
Daria Strokous
Natalia Vodianova
Anne Vyalitsyna
Inna Zobova

Sportspeople

Basketball

David Blatt, U.S. college & Israeli professional guard; coach in Israel & Russia, Russian national basketball team
Alex Chubrevich (born 1986), Israeli basketball player
 Alexander Gomelsky, head coach of USSR national team for 30 years, including victory in 1988 Summer Olympics, Naismith Basketball Hall of Fame, FIBA Hall of Fame
Andrei Kirilenko, NBA basketball player
 Daniel Koperberg (born 1997), Israeli basketball player
Egor Koulechov (born 1994), Israeli-Russian professional basketball player for Israeli team Ironi Nahariya
Kirill Pishchalnikov, PBL, NCAA, basketball player

Boxers

Boris Lagutin, double Olympic gold medalist light-middleweight division
Oleg Maskaev, professional boxer, former WBC Heavyweight Champion
Dmitry Pirog, professional boxer, WBO Middleweight Champion
Alexander Povetkin, Olympic gold medalist
Natascha Ragosina, boxing world champion
Shamil Sabirov, Olympic gold medalist light flyweight
Oleg Saitov, double Olympic gold medalist in the welterweight division
Aleksei Tishchenko, Olympic gold medalist featherweight and lightweight divisions
Kostya Tszyu, professional boxer, former Undisputed Junior Welterweight champion
Nikolai Valuev, professional boxer, former two-time WBA Heavyweight champion

Chess players

Alexander Alekhine
Yuri Averbakh
Mikhail Chigorin
Mikhail Botvinnik
Semen Furman
Anatoly Karpov
Garry Kasparov
Victor Korchnoi
Vladimir Kramnik
Grigory Levenfish
Andor Lilienthal
Vyacheslav Ragozin
Vasily Smyslov
Boris Spassky
Leonid Yudasin

Fencers
Maria Mazina (born 1964), épée fencer, Olympic gold medalist, bronze
Mark Midler (1931–2012), foil fencer, 2-time Olympic champion
Mark Rakita (born 1938), saber fencer, 2-time Olympic champion, 2-time silver
Yakov Rylsky (1928–1999), saber fencer, Olympic champion
Sergey Sharikov (1974–2015), sabre fencer, two-time Olympic gold medalist, silver, bronze
David Tyshler (1927–2014), sabre fencer, Olympic bronze medalist
Eduard Vinokurov (1942–2010), sabre fencer, 2-time Olympic gold medalist, silver, six-time team world champion
Iosif Vitebskiy (born 1938), épée fencer, Soviet Ukrainian Olympic medalist and world champion and fencing coach

Figure skaters

Ludmila Belousova, two-time Olympic pairs champion
Ekaterina Gordeeva, two-time Olympic pairs champion
Aleksandr Gorelik, pair skater, Olympic silver, World Championship 2-time silver, bronze
Sergei Grinkov, two-time Olympic pairs champion
Gennadi Karponossov, Olympic champion, 2-time World Champion, silver, 2-time bronze, ice dancer & coach
Evgeni Plushenko, 2006 Olympic champion
Oleg Protopopov, two-time Olympic pairs champion
Irina Slutskaya, two-time World Champion, 3-time silver, bronze, Olympic silver, bronze
Maxim Staviski, World Champion ice dancer, silver, bronze
Alexei Urmanov, 1994 Olympic champion
Alexei Yagudin, 2002 Olympic champion
Alina Zagitova, 2018 Olympic champion and Grand Slam (figure skating) winner

Gymnasts

Nikolai Andrianov, winner of 15 Olympic medals
Yelena Davydova, 1980 Olympic all-around champion
Svetlana Khorkina, winner of 7 Olympic medals
Olga Korbut, winner of 4 Olympic medals
Yevgeniya Kanayeva, only rhythmic gymnast to win two Olympic all-around gold medals
Sofia Muratova, winner of 8 Olympic medals
Aliya Mustafina, 2012 Olympic gold medalist
Alexei Nemov, winner of 12 Olympic medals
Natalia Shaposhnikova, two-time Olympic champion
Yelena Shushunova, Olympic champion
Aleksandr Tkachyov, two-time Olympic champion

Ice hockey players

Maxim Afinogenov, NHL player
Yevgeny Babich, Olympic gold medalist
Ilya Bryzgalov, Phoenix Coyotes goalie. former NHL star.
Pavel Bure, NHL player
Valeri Bure
Pavel Datsyuk, NHL player
Vitaly Davydov, 3-time Olympic gold medalist, World & European champion 1963–71, runner-up 1972
Sergei Gonchar, NHL player
Sergei Fedorov, NHL player
Viacheslav Fetisov
Kirill Kaprizov, NHL player
Nikolai Khabibulin, NHL goalie
Valeri Kharlamov, international ice hockey player
Vladimir Konstantinov
Ilya Kovalchuk, NHL player
Alexei Kovalev 
Vyacheslav Kozlov
Alfred Kuchevsky, Olympic champion 1956, bronze 1960; twice world champion.
Oleg Kvasha
Igor Larionov
Yuri Lyapkin (born 1945), ice hockey player, Soviet Hockey League, Olympic gold medal, Russian and Soviet Hockey Hall of Fame
Evgeni Malkin, NHL player
Sergei Makarov
Andrei Markov
Boris Mikhailov
Alexander Ovechkin, NHL player
Alexander Radulov, KHL player
Semyon Varlamov, NHL goalie
Vladimir Petrov
Alexei Ponikarovsky
Alexander Semin, NHL player
Vladislav Tretiak, goalie
Alexander Yakushev
Alexie Yashin forward
Yevgeni Zimin Olympic champion 1968–72, World & European champion 1968–69, 1971
Viktor Zinger, Olympic champion 1968; world champion 1965–69
Sergei Zubov

Association football players

Igor Akinfeev, goalkeeper
Dmitri Alenichev, midfielder
Andrei Arshavin, midfielder, striker
Vladimir Beschastnykh, striker
Konstantin Beskov, striker, coach
Grigori Bogemsky, striker
Valentin Bubukin, midfielder, coach
Mikhail Gershkovich (born 1948), striker, coach
Valentin Ivanov, Sr., striker, coach
Gavriil Kachalin, midfielder, coach
Andrei Kanchelskis, midfielder
Valery Karpin, midfielder, coach
Dmitri Kharine, goalkeeper
Rushan Khasanov, defender, midfielder, striker
 Shmuel Kozokin (born 1987), Israeli defender
Gennady Logofet (1942–2011), footballer and football coach
Aleksandr Mostovoi, midfielder
Igor Netto, defender, coach
Viktor Onopko, defender
Sergei Ovchinnikov, goalkeeper, coach
Roman Pavlyuchenko, striker
Boris Razinsky (1933—2012), goalkeeper/striker, Olympic gold medal, manager
Oleg Salenko, striker
Nikita Simonyan, first vice-president of the Russian Football Union
Eduard Streltsov, midfielder, striker
Andrey Tikhonov, midfielder
Arkadi Tyapkin (1895-1942), defender
Lev Yashin (1929—1990), voted the best goalkeeper of the 20th century by the IFFHS.
Ivan Yegorov (1891–1943), striker
Valery Voronin, midfielder
Yuri Zhirkov (born 1983), defender, midfielder
 Mihail Titow, forward

Tennis players

Nikolay Davydenko, former consistent top 10 player
Elena Dementieva, silver medal at the 2000 Summer Olympics and gold medal at the 2008 Summer Olympics
 Natela Dzalamidze (born 1993), tennis player, took on Georgian citizenship
Yevgeny Kafelnikov, former world no. 1 tennis player
Anna Kournikova, former top 10 tennis player
Svetlana Kuznetsova, former world no. 2 tennis player. Won the 2004 U.S. Open and 2009 French Open
 Evgenia Linetskaya (born 1986), Russian-born Israeli tennis player
Anastasia Myskina, former world no. 2 tennis player. Won the 2004 French Open (becoming the first Russian woman to win a grand slam title)
 Daniel Prenn (1904–1991), Russian-born German, Polish, and British world-top-ten tennis player
Marat Safin, former world no. 1 tennis player. Won 2000 U.S. Open and 2005 Australian Open.
Dinara Safina, former world no. 1 ladies tennis player
Maria Sharapova, former world no. 1 tennis player. Won 2004 Wimbledon, 2006 U.S. Open, 2008 Australian Open, 2012 French Open and silver medal at the 2012 Summer Olympics
Vera Zvonareva, two time Grand Slam finalist
Daniil Medvedev, former world no. 1 tennis player and 2021 US Open champion.

Weightlifters
Vasily Alexeev, Olympic weightlifter, set 80 World Records
Yuri Vlasov, weightlifter, 1960 Olympic gold medalist
Arkady Vorobyov, weightlifter, two-time Olympic gold medalist
Leonid Zhabotinsky, weightlifter, two-time Olympic gold medalist

Other sportspeople

Aleksandr Vladimirovich Popov, Olympic wrestling champion (Greco-Roman flyweight), Olympic-medal-winning shooter
Alexander Karelin, most Olympic medals in speed skating
Anatoli Boukreev, 3 Olympic gold medals, 9 Olympic medals
Boris Maksovich Gurevich, IFBB professional bodybuilder
Daniil Kvyat, discus thrower, mountaineer, mountaineer, mountaineer, Sumo wrestler, track and field athlete, pole vaulter, shot putter, speed skater, sprinter, swimmer, swimmer, champion
Evgeny Abalakov, American football player, Formula 1 driver, Greco-Roman wrestling, Heavyweight Champion of the W.A.M.M.A and the last holder of the Heavyweight champion of Pride Fighting Championships
Fedor Emelianenko, MMA Fighter
Inga Artamonova, made the first ascent of the highest point of the Soviet Union – Stalin Peak (later renamed)
John Barsha, drove for Lotus Renault GP
Khabib Nurmagomedov, Former UFC Lightweight Champion
Lev Vainshtein, obtained the rank of Komusubi
Lidia Skoblikova, two-time Olympic gold medalist
Lisa Cross, 1992 Olympic gold medalist
Maria Leontyavna Itkina, winner of two Olympic medals
Mikhail Mamistov, 2-time world champion
Natalya Nazarova, professional poker player, six-time champion in aerobatics at World Air Games, the first Soviet Olympic Champion
Nina Romashkova, powered and glider aerobatic pilot
Roho (Soslan Boradzov), first Russian to win a World Series of Poker bracelet
Semyon Belits-Geiman, Olympic freestyle swimmer
Svetlana Kapanina
Svetlana Krivelyova, former Formula 1 driver, four time world all-around speed skating champion
Vitaly Abalakov, more than any other woman
Vitaly Petrov, world-record-holding runner
Yelena Isinbayeva, 2004 Olympic gold medalist
Yevgeny Sadovyi, 18 successful ascents on peaks above 8000 m
Yuriy Borzakovskiy, given several Soviet sporting awards

Activists and revolutionaries
 Vera Karelina

Legendary and folk heroes

Alyosha Popovich, young and cunning bogatyr of priest origin, defeated the dragon Tugarin Zmeyevich by trickery
Baba Yaga, witch-like character in Russian folklore, flies around on a giant mortar and lives in the cabin on chicken legs
Dobrynya Nikitich, bogatyr of noble origin, defeated the dragon Zmey Gorynych
Ilya Muromets, bogatyr of peasant origin, saint, the greatest of all the legendary bogatyrs, defeated the forest-dwelling monster Nightingale the Robber, defended Rus' from numerous attacks by the steppe people
Ivan Tsarevich, typical noble protagonist of Russian fairy tales, often engaged in a struggle with Koschei and rescuing young girls
Ivan the Fool, typical simple-minded but lucky protagonist of Russian fairy tales
Koschei "the Deathless"'', chief male antagonist of Russian fairy tales, an ugly senile sorcerer and kidnapper of young maids, possesses immortality
Nikita the Furrier, town craftsman who released the daughter of Prince Vladimir the Fair Sun from the dragon's captivity
Sadko, musician and merchant from Veliky Novgorod, procured wealth and wife from the Sea Tsar by playing gusli
Svyatogor, giant "sacred mountain" bogatyr, passed his strength to Ilya Muromets
Vasilisa the Beautiful, young, attractive and often cunning heroine of Russian fairy tales

See also

History of Germans in Russia and the Soviet Union
List of Chuvashs
List of Jews from the Soviet Union
List of people from Saint Petersburg
List of people from Tambov
List of Armenians
List of Azerbaijanis
List of Belarusians
List of Georgians
List of Karelians
List of Kazakhs
List of Tajiks
List of Tatars
List of Tuvans
List of Ukrainians
List of Uzbeks

References